= Everglades Headwaters National Wildlife Refuge and Conservation Area =

National Wildlife Refuge in Florida

- IUCN category V (protected landscape/seascape)
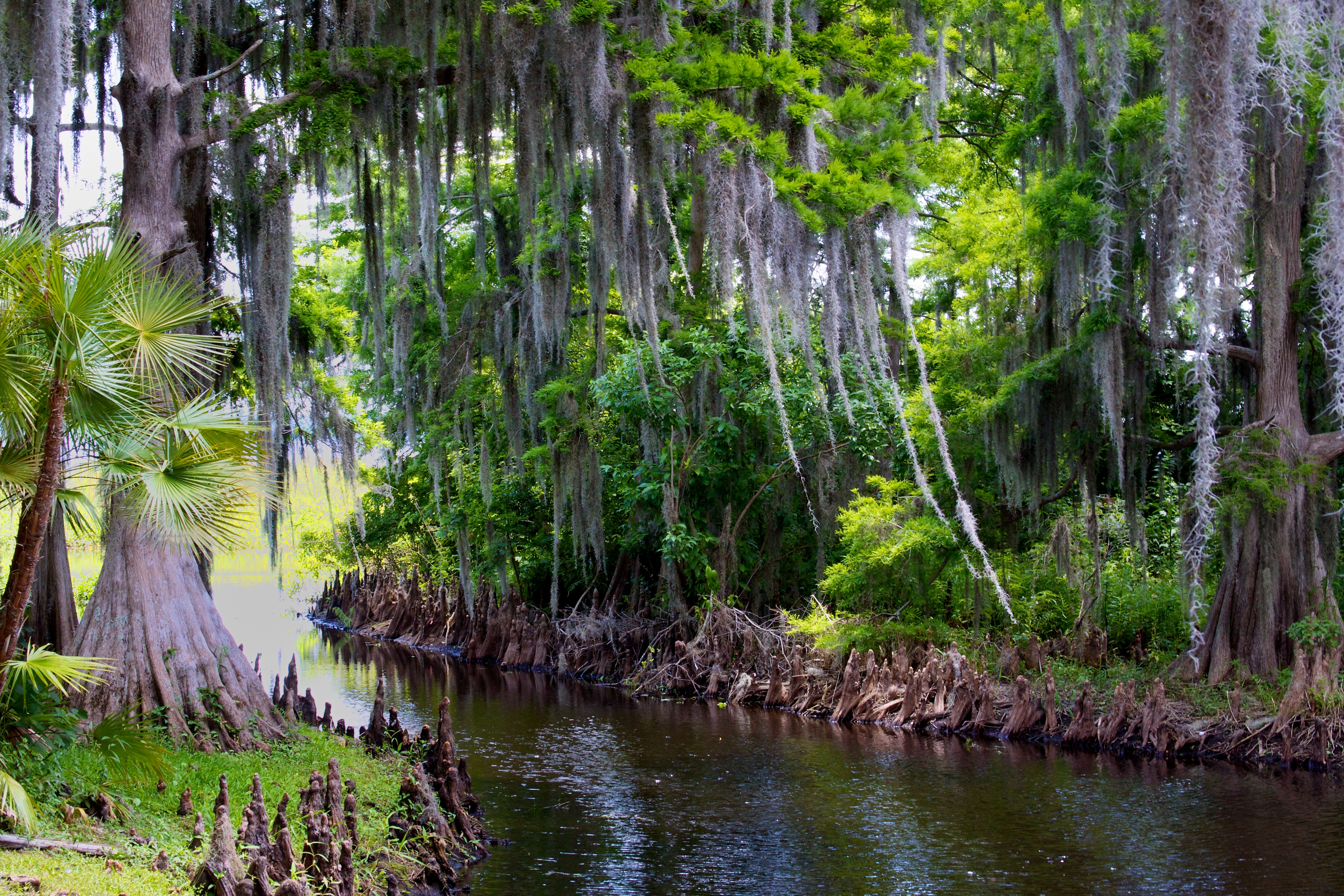

- Location within the United States
- Location: Hardee County, Highlands County, and Polk County, Florida, United States
- Nearest city: Avon Park Lakes, Florida
- Coordinates: 27°39′N 81°31′W
- Area: 900 acres (360 ha)
- Established: 1991
- Governing body: United States Fish and Wildlife Service
- Website: Archie Carr National Wildlife Refuge

The Everglades Headwaters National Wildlife Refuge and Conservation Area, created in 2012, is the newest addition and 556th unit of the United States National Wildlife Refuge (NWR) System. It began with 10 acres (4.0 ha) donated to the conservation effort as part of the Obama administration's America's Great Outdoors Initiative.

== Management ==
The Everglades refuge is managed by the Everglades Headwaters National Wildlife Refuge Complex, which also includes the Pelican Island NWR, Lake Wales Ridge National Wildlife Refuge, and the Archie Carr NWR.

== Founding and expansion ==
In 2012, Ken Salazar announced the creation of the Everglades Headwaters National Wildlife Refuge and Conservation Area, that is, and will be, a large area of land south of Orlando and to the north of Lake Okeechobee. The original donation was 10 acres, but the goal was to extend it to 50,000 acres.

Florida's Rural and Family Lands Protection Act provides funding for easements on thousands of acres of working ranches in the Everglades system, as part of the Everglades restoration, targeted to be 100,000 acres in all. Another new NWR is also planned for the area between the Florida Panther National Wildlife Refuge in the Southwest and the new Everglades Headwaters NWR.

=== Added land ===
On March 24, 2016, the Adams Ranch in Fort Pierce was the first set of conservation easements added to the NWR, followed the Hatchineha Ranch owned by the Nature Conservancy, Adams Ranch, Camp Lonesome, Tiger Cattle Company and the Idols Aside property, totalling more than 4,214.99 acres (1,705.75 ha) with an additional 1,502.26 acres (607.94 ha) of purchased land that includes 400 acres (160 ha) of donated land. The added land and leases were provided by a Land and Water Conservation Fund (LWCF) of $12.5 million used by the U.S. Fish and Wildlife Service. These added conservation easements, fee acquisitions, and purchases will ensure protection for gopher tortoise and the endangered Florida grasshopper sparrow.

== Flora ==
There is a diverse habitat, ranging from "Pine Flatwoods" that is habitat range for the Florida panther and Florida black bear, "Xeric Oak Scrub" community that includes myrtle oak, Chapman's oak, sand-live oak, scrub holly, scrub plum, scrub hickory, rosemary, and saw palmetto, and the Florida Ziziphus, habitat for the sand skink. The "Freshwater Marsh and Wet Prairie" includes habitat such as the pickerel weed, sawgrass, maidencane, arrowhead, fire flag, cattail, spike rush, bulrush, white water lily, water shield, and various other sedges

== Endangered species ==
The Florida jujube listed as federally endangered, pygmy fringetree listed as endangered, Florida sand skink, Eastern Indigo Snake, Sand Pine, Scrub Beargrass, and Scrub Blazing Star.

== Future plans ==
Long-range plans include purchasing land where practical or conservation easements or fee acquisitions, to restore the headwater flow from central Florida down to the Florida Everglades. Areas impacted are mitigation lands owned by Celebration (Walker Ranch), a subsidiary of Disney Corporation, Three Lakes Management Area (1,261.51 acres (510.51 ha)), Lake Kissimmee State Park (472.20 acres (191.09 ha)), lands around Lake Tiger, levees around Lake Hatchineha, Lake Kissimmee, and Lake Cypress that is approximately 20,800 acres (8,400 ha). Widening of canals connecting Lake Kissimmee to Lake Hatchineha, C-37 from 70 to 90 feet, and between Lake Hatchineha and Lake Cypress, C-36 from 48 to 60 feet. Certain levees will be degraded to accommodate water flow. Populated areas will have to have sewage modifications. The goal will be to re-establish the ecological integrity of 36,500 acres (14,800 ha) of wetland in the lower basin ecosystem. The total impacted area will increase by 30,300 acres (12,300 ha) or 55% of historical levels before lake level controls.
