= Lake Wales Ridge National Wildlife Refuge =

United States National Wildlife Refuge in Florida

- IUCN category IV (habitat/species management area)
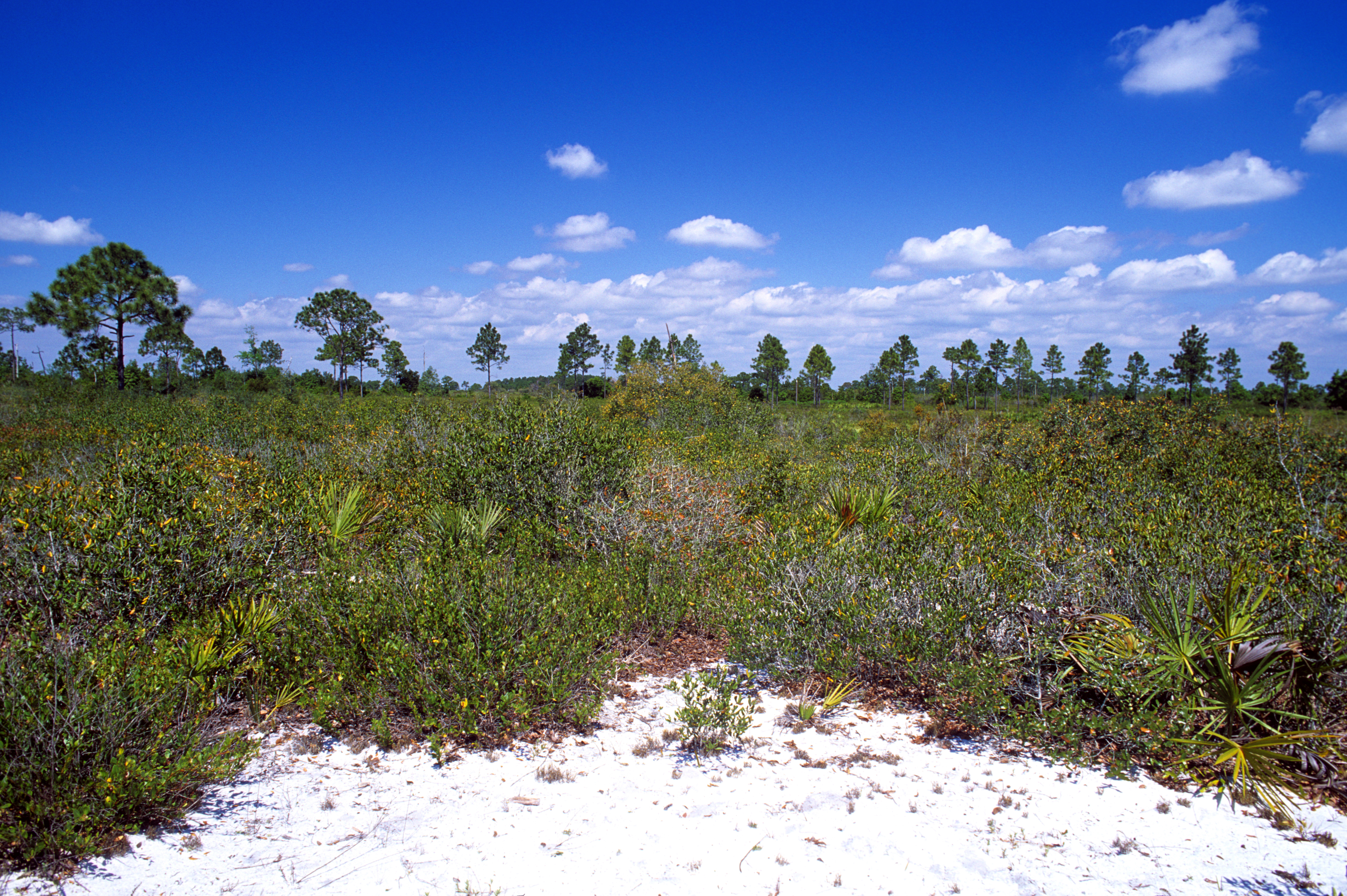
- Florida scrub on the Lake Wales Ridge, December 2013

- Location within the United States
- Location: Polk and Highlands counties, Florida, United States
- Nearest city: Lake Wales, Florida
- Coordinates: 27°22′06″N 81°19′52″W
- Area: 1,194 acres (483 ha)
- Established: 1990
- Governing body: US Fish & Wildlife Service
- Website: Lake Wales Ridge National Wildlife Refuge

The Lake Wales Ridge National Wildlife Refuge is part of the United States National Wildlife Refuge (NWR) System, located in four separated areas on the Lake Wales Ridge east of US 27 between Davenport and Sebring in Florida. The 1,194 acre (4.8 km^{2}) refuge was established in 1990, to protect a host of plants and animals. It is also the first to be designated primarily for the preservation of endangered plants, and is not open to the general public. It contains a high proportion of remaining Florida scrub habitat. It is administered as part of the Merritt Island National Wildlife Refuge.

== Management ==
Since 2012 the Lake Wales Ridge NWR has been administered by the Everglades Headwaters National Wildlife Refuge Complex, along with the Pelican Island NWR, Archie Carr NWR, and the Everglades Headwaters National Wildlife Refuge and Conservation Area.

== Flora ==
The plants the refuge was designed to protect are the snakeroot (Eryngium cuneifolium), scrub blazing star (Liatris ohlingerae), Carter's mustard (Warea carteri), papery Whitlow-wort (Paronychia chartacea), Florida bonamia (Bonamia grandiflora), scrub lupine (Lupinus aridorum), highlands scrub hypericum (Hypericum cumulicola), Garett's mint (Dicerandra christmanii), scrub mint (Dicerandra frutescens), pygmy fringetree (Chionanthus pygmaeus), wireweed (Polygonum basiramia), sandlace (Polygonum dentoceras), Florida ziziphus (Pseudoziziphus celata), and scrub plum (Prunus geniculata).

== Fauna ==
The animals the refuge was designed to protect are the Florida scrub jay (Aphelocoma coerulescens), eastern indigo snake (Drymarchon couperi), bluetail mole skink (Plestiodon egregius lividus), and sand skink (Neoseps reynoldsi). The region is also likely of great importance for the conservation of diverse smaller fauna, e.g. Florida scrub arthropods, etc, including examples of neglected regional endemics such as the Lake Placid funnel wolf spider (Sosippus placidus Brady, 1972), which is a species of conservation concern.
