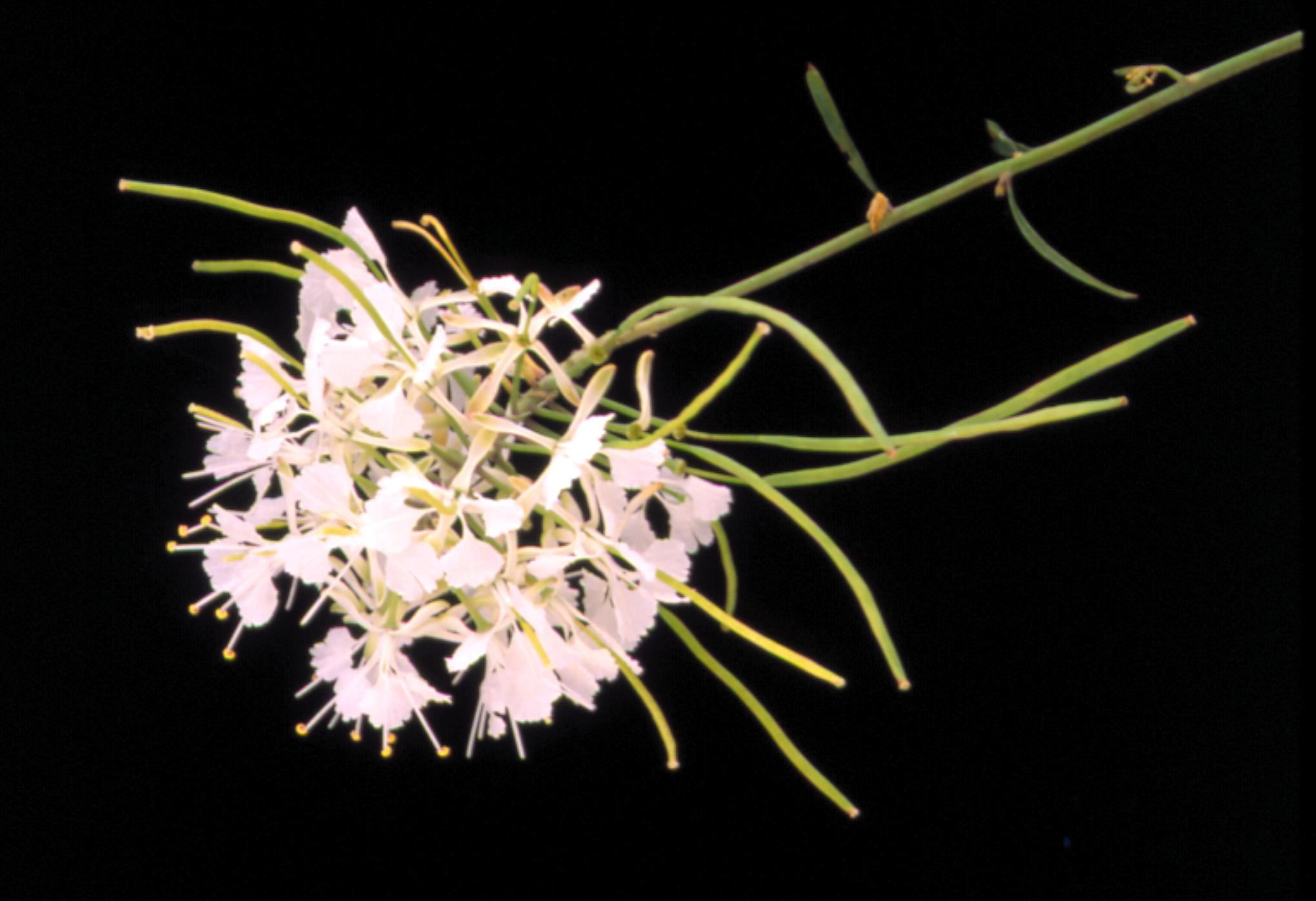

Conservation status
- Endangered (ESA)

- Critically Imperiled (NatureServe)

Scientific classification
- Kingdom: Plantae
- Clade: Tracheophytes
- Clade: Angiosperms
- Clade: Eudicots
- Clade: Rosids
- Order: Brassicales
- Family: Brassicaceae
- Genus: Warea
- Species: W. carteri

Binomial name
- Warea carteri Small
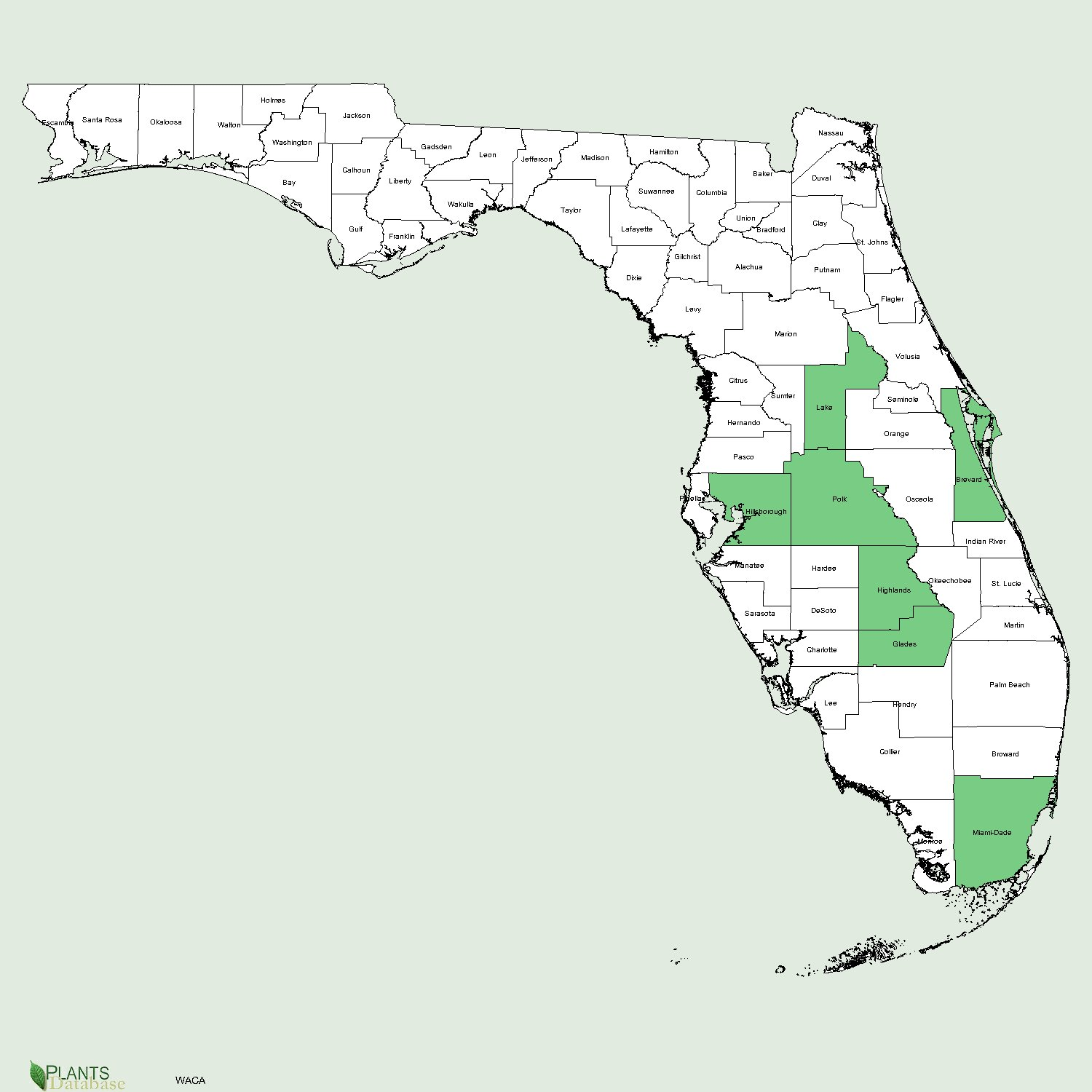
- Warea carteri distribution

= Warea carteri =

Species of flowering plant

Warea carteri is a species of plant in the mustard family, Brassicaceae, known by the common names Carter's pinelandcress and Carter's mustard. It is an endangered, fire-dependent annual herb occurring in xeric, shrub-dominated habitats on the Lake Wales Ridge of central Florida in the United States.

== Description ==
Warea carteri is an annual herb, 0.2 to 1.5 m tall with erect green stems. The plants usually have many slender, ascending branches forming an open, rounded crown. The leaves lack stipules and are arranged alternately on the stem. Lower leaves are lost by the time the plant flowers. Leaf size and shape varies with age and position on the plant. At the time of flowering, leaf petioles range from 0.8 to 3.9 mm with blades 1 to 3 cm long. Towards the tips of stems, the leaves are smaller and narrowly elliptical to almost linear, while closer to the bases of stems and branches, the leaves are larger and oblanceolate or spatulate. All leaves are rounded at the tip, their margins entire, and their bases attenuate to cuneate. The lower leaves can also be undulate, margined or lobed. The many inflorescences of W. carteri are dense, rounded racemes with many flowers (60 or more). The flowers are radially symmetric, with four white linearoblanceolate sepals, about 4.5 mm long, and curved toward the center of the flower at the tip. The four petals are white, about 6.0 mm long, with more than half their length in the form of a slender claw. The petal's blade is nearly round with irregular margins. The six spreading stamens are irregularly subequal in length and arise from a nectar-producing floral disc. The ovary is superior, cylindric, about 2.3 mm long, and raised on a slender stalk (gynophore) about 2 mm long. The sessile stigma has two lobes. W. carteri is protandrous: the anthers begin to dehisce within an hour or two after the flower has opened. The stigmas are receptive until 2 to 4 days afterwards, by which time the stamens on that flower have dropped. Warea carteris fruit is a silique, long, slender pod divided lengthwise by a partition (septum). The pod is flattened, cylindrical in cross-section and gently curved along its length, which is 4 to 6 cm long and 1.5 mm wide. The pod is borne on a gynophore, which is a stalk-bearing pistil 5 to 6 mm long, above a spreading pedicel, which is around 8.5 mm long. The pod carries numerous oblong seeds, each 1.5 mm long Fruits split apart passively to shed the seeds.

== Taxonomy ==
Warea carteri was named by Small in 1909. A review of the genus by Channel and James in 1964 retained Small's treatment of the species. There are no scientific synonyms. Other common names for the species include Carter's warea, and Carter-warea.

== Distribution ==
From what is known of the historic distribution of W. carteri, it occurred in scrubby flatwoods and sandhills of the Lake Wales Ridge in Highlands, Polk, and Lake counties, in South Florida slash pine forests of the Miami area in Miami-Dade County, and in coastal scrub in Brevard County. It has been found in yellow sand scrub at Lake Wales Ridge State Forest. The current known distribution of W. carteri includes Highlands, Polk, and Lake counties on the Lake Wales Ridge in central Florida. It may occur in Brevard County on Florida's Atlantic coast, although these historical sites may have been developed.

== Habitat ==
The two largest populations of W. carteri on the Lake Wales Ridge occur at Archbold Biological Station and The Nature Conservancy's Tiger Creek Preserve. At Archbold Biological Station, W. carteri occurs in scrubby flatwoods and in sandhills dominated by Turkey Oak and hickory, and is often found in the ecotone between these two vegetation types. Because sandhills occur on yellow sands, W. carteri is often found in or near yellow sands. Several populations of W. carteri at Archbold Biological Station are adjacent to roads, fire lanes, or in areas with historic human disturbance. At Tiger Creek Preserve, W. carteri is found in degraded sandhill habitat where Turkey Oak is abundant, in scrubby flatwoods, and in xeric hammocks. The collection of W. carteri made in Brevard County was in coastal scrub. In Miami-Dade County, W. carteri was found in South Florida slash pine (Pinus elliotti var. densa) flatwoods. Here it may have occupied some of the same sites as Tiny Polygala (Polygala smallii) and Miami Palmetto (Sabal miamiensis), both of which occur in areas with a sandy surface rather than bare oolite.

== Reproduction ==
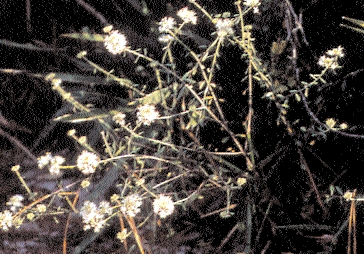
Habit

Experiments have demonstrated that Warea carteri is self-pollinating, autogamous, and self-compatible. Autogamy and self-compatibility allow isolated or sparsely distributed individuals to reproduce. Natural levels of fruit- and seed-set are quite high, with a fruit-set of 62 percent, and seed-set of 50 percent. Self-pollinated flowers showed significantly lower fruit- and seed-set, 41 percent fruit-set and 28 percent seed-set. This indicates that insect-mediated pollination is important in keeping fruit- and seed-set high, and individual fecundity high. Pollinators appear to be the limiting factor in fruit and seed production. Because aboveground populations fluctuate wildly, autogamy helps ensure fecundity and may be a key life history trait. Germination in W. carteri occurs in late winter through early spring (January–March). Flowering occurs in September and October. Fruiting occurs in October and November, and dispersal follows in November and early December. Preliminary observations of insect activity on W. carteri indicate it is a generalist with respect to pollination. A great diversity of insects visit the flowers, including native solitary bees, bumblebees, syrphids (known as hoverflies or bee-flies), wasps, flies, beetles, etc. Within-plant movements by insects appear to predominate over among-plant movements. Because of this, and in combination with the close proximity of male and female flowers in an inflorescence, self-pollination probably is a regular method of reproduction in this species. There are no obvious specialized forms of seed dispersal in W. carteri. The siliques do not open explosively; rather, the external walls of the fruit peel away from the central septum as the fruit slowly dries, exposing the mature seeds inside. The seeds drop passively to the ground or they may be flung a bit further if the plant is brushed. It is not likely that seeds are moved by wind once they reach the ground. Collection or movement of seeds of W. carteri by ants or other animals has not been studied, but there are no obvious specialized structures on the seed that would encourage such movement. Large fluctuations observed in above ground population size suggest the possibility that seed banking plays a significant role in W. carteris biology. Environmental cues necessary for germination were explored experimentally at Archbold Biological Station. Moisture and light were found to be necessary for germination. The use of an oak leachate did not significantly affect germination. Some seeds stored in dry, dark conditions for 2 years germinated, demonstrating the potential of W. carteris seeds to remain dormant at least that long. Fire-related cues such as heat do not stimulate germination, but germination does require light and seeds may remain dormant for more than 2 years.

== Relationship to other species ==
Warea carteri typically occurs in dry oak sites where other scrub endemics are scarce and at the ecotone between scrub and high pineland with other plants: Eriogonum longifolium var. gnaphalifolium (scrub buckwheat) and Prunus geniculata (scrub plum) (K. DeLaney, Environmental Research Consultants, Inc., personal communication 1995). W. carteri does not seem to suffer badly from herbivory or predation by vertebrates or invertebrates, but a small percent of individuals do seem to suffer from the growth of a mold or fungus (M. Evans, Archbold Biological Station, personal communication 1995). There have not been any specific studies of W. carteri's competitive relationships with other species. It is not clear whether the lack of above ground individuals in areas not recently burned is due to competition from other vegetation or if a direct effect of fire is necessary for germination (i.e. nutrient pulse, smoke, etc.). Although some persistent populations of W. carteri are found in openings in disturbed sites, populations in natural habitats following fire do not seem to be concentrated in openings between shrubs. In dense xeric hammocks though, they may prefer tree-canopy gaps.

== Status and trends ==
Warea carteri was listed as an endangered species in 1987 due to habitat loss (52 FR 2234). The primary threats to W. carteris persistence are habitat destruction and fire suppression. On the Lake Wales Ridge, W. carteri is threatened primarily by the conversion of its habitat to citrus groves or residential subdivisions. In Highlands County, 64.2 percent of the xeric vegetation (sand pine scrub, scrubby flatwoods, and southern ridge sandhills) present before settlement was converted to other land uses by 1981. An additional 10.3 percent of the xeric vegetation was moderately altered, primarily by building roads to create residential subdivisions (Peroni and Abrahamson 1985). The situation is similar in Polk and Lake counties. Fire suppression has been in practice throughout W. carteris range for many decades. Fire suppression is a threat to this species because its demography and reproduction seem to be closely tied to fire. The historical distribution of W. carteri includes the sites of at least 14 herbarium collections made in what is now the Miami urban area in Miami-Dade County, from 1878 to 1934. Nearly all of the suitable habitat for the plant in this area has been altered by urban growth. The remaining tracts of native vegetation have been searched carefully in recent years.ec The plant is almost certainly extirpated from the county. Warea carteri has probably been extirpated from Brevard County as well as no specimens have been observed in recent years. The status of the two largest populations of W. carteri in central Florida (at Archbold Biological Station and Tiger Creek Preserve) has been monitored for 6 years (M. Evans, Archbold Biological Station, personal communication 1995). Extreme fluctuations of population size are observed year to year. The data accumulated on population sizes indicate a strong relationship with fire. W. carteri seems to respond quickly, strongly, and positively to fire. Major population increases and the discovery of new populations consistently occur 1 year after fire, while major population crashes, including the appearance of no above ground individuals, occur 2 years after fire. The demography of W. carteri is being studied at Archbold Biological Station, Tiger Creek Preserve, and the Lake Placid Scrub. Dozens of local patches are known from Archbold Biological Station and Tiger Creek Preserve, although not all patches have aboveground plants in any given year. At both Archbold Biological Station and Tiger Creek Preserve, many W. carteri populations have behaved fairly predictably in response to fire. Populations either appear or boom the year following fire (11 of 16 instances of population doubling at Tiger Creek Preserve occurred the year after a fire). Population crashes occur in the second year (18 of 26 populations at Tiger Creek Preserve lost more than 50 percent 2 years post fire). Populations in sites that have experienced prolonged fire suppression usually persist only in very low above ground densities. Warea carteri is currently protected at Archbold Biological Station, Lake Placid Scrub, Tiger Creek Preserve, Lake Wales Ridge SF, Snell Creek and Horse Creek. Polk County. BLM is in contact with the SFWMD and FWS to determine the best course of action to pursue in order to protect and manage W. carteri at this site.

== Management ==
The natural fire return interval in the various vegetation communities W. carteri inhabits ranges from every 2 to 6 years for turkey oak-dominated sandhill, to every 6 to 10 years in scrubby flatwoods, to every 10 to 20 years in hickory-dominated sandhill (Myers 1990). Through demographic monitoring of W. carteri, it is becoming clear that fire is an essential management tool to maintain large populations of this species. As with other rare species, habitat protection is a key element to preservation of W. carteri. In the absence of fire, populations of W. carteri have survived in smaller numbers in areas of prior human disturbance, such as the margins of roads or fire lanes. Several other Lake Wales Ridge endemics that are also federally listed appear to be favored by disturbance in this fashion including: Eryngium cuneifolium (snakeroot), Polygonum dentoceras (sand lace), Prunus geniculata (scrub plum) and Conradina brevifolia (short-leaved rosemary) (Johnson 1981), as well as Polygonum basiramia (wireweed) and Dicerandra frutescens (scrub mint) (Menges 1992). Warea carteri is a locally abundant annual that may remain dormant as seed for several years, so a population may have a substantial number of growing, flowering plants only in the first year after a fire. Because this species is conspicuous only when in flower, monitoring and finding populations is difficult. As previously mentioned, fire management is a critical concern for this species. Long intervals between fires are likely to result in the real loss of viable seeds from the seed bank and declines in population sizes. The risk of extinction for this species is likely to be higher without proper fire management. For management considerations, it is important to realize that at sites where W. carteri is known to occur, individual plants or all the plants at a site may not appear above ground in any given year. One year of searching is not enough to know whether a given site has W. carteri. This species is inconspicuous except during a brief flowering period lasting about a month. In addition, its remaining habitat on the Lake Wales Ridge has not been thoroughly surveyed. As a result, the present distributional records are likely incomplete. The annual habit of Warea carteri, and its widely separated known localities, makes assessment of its status or planning its conservation more difficult than is the case for perennial herbs or shrubs.
