= Allen David Broussard Catfish Creek Preserve State Park =

State park in Florida, United States

Allen David Broussard Catfish Creek Preserve
- IUCN category V (protected landscape/seascape)
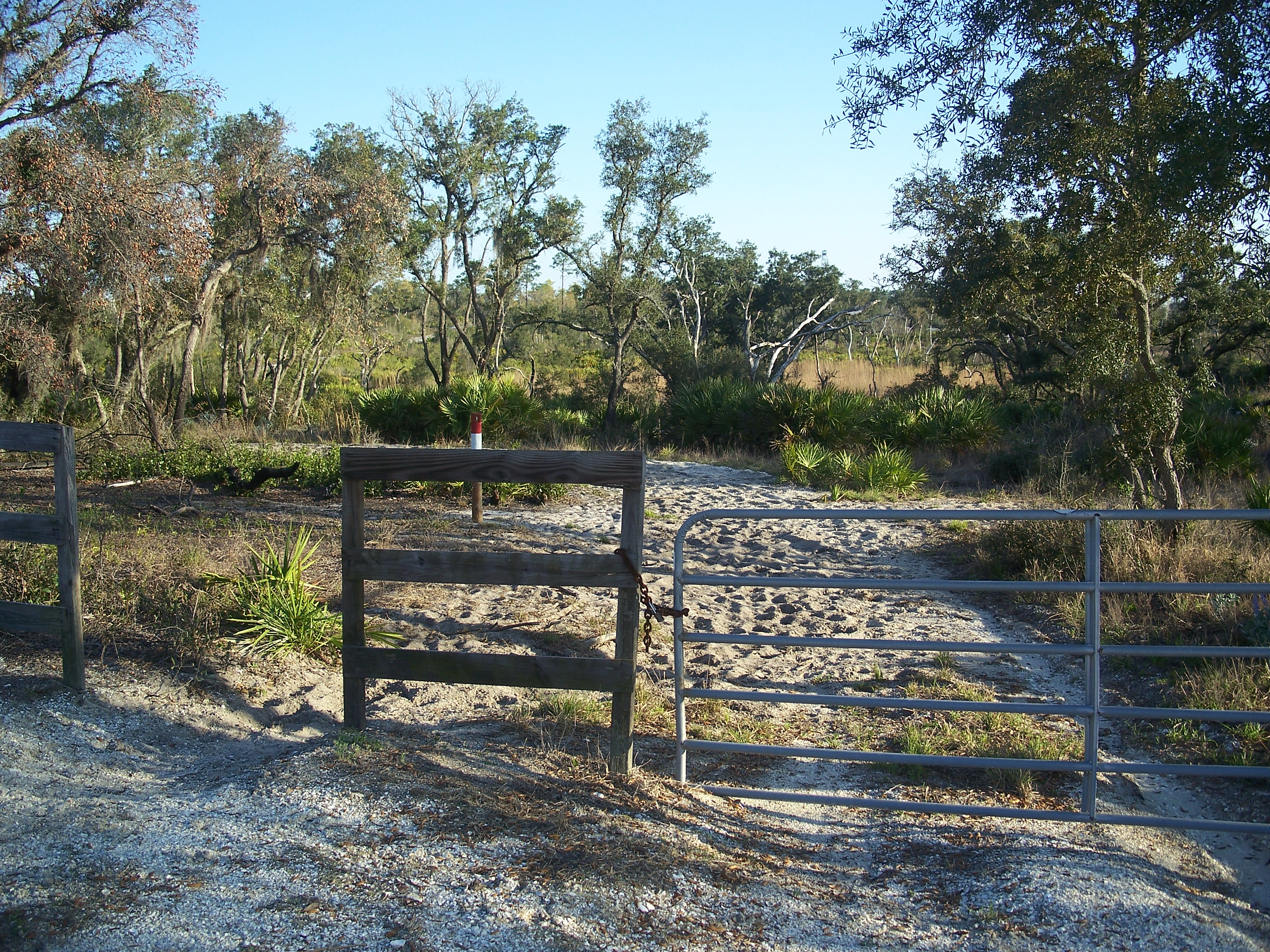
- Trail through the park

- Location within Florida Location within the United States
- Interactive map of Allen David Broussard Catfish Creek Preserve
- Location: Polk County, Florida, USA
- Nearest city: Haines City, Florida
- Coordinates: 27.9840°N 81.4970°W
- Governing body: Florida Department of Environmental Protection

Allen David Broussard Catfish Creek Preserve is a Florida State Park. It includes more than 8,000 acres (3,200 ha) of varied habitats on and adjacent to the Lake Wales Ridge in Polk County. A number of rare and threatened or endangered plants and animals are found in the park.

== Description ==
The park includes over 8,000 acres (3,200 ha) on the Lake Wales Ridge in Haines City. The park, which was established in December 1991, is part of the Florida Forever Catfish Creek project, which was created in 1990 to protect and restore more than 20,000 acres (8,100 ha) of high scrub ridges, lakes scattered within the ridges, and part of the shoreline of Lake Pierce. As of 2025, the state of Florida had acquired 17,064 acres (6,906 ha) of the project land. Two pre-European contact archaeological sites, the Ingram Ranch Site (archaeological site designation PO10677) and Snodgrass Island Site (PO3866), are in the park.

== Ecosystem ==
The park includes scrub, sandhill, scrubby flatwood, mesic flatwood, xeric hammock, bottomland hardwood forest, basin swamp, sandhill upland lake, wet flatwood, blackwater stream, seepage slope and floodplain swamp habitats. Rare plants found in the park include scrub morning glory, scrub plum, pygmy fringe tree, cutthroat grass, scrub mint, Florida blazing star, Lewton's polygala, and scrub buckwheat. The park is also home to protected and rare animals such as the Florida panther, wood stork, Florida scrub jay, bald eagle, gopher tortoise, Florida sand skink, Florida scrub lizard, Florida black bear, blue calamintha bee, Morris' tiny sand-loving scarab, Archbold bess beetle, Archbold cebrionid beetle, and tough buckthorn bee.

== Access ==
There is no entrance charge. Florida state parks are open between 8 a.m. and sundown every day of the year (including holidays).

== Gallery ==
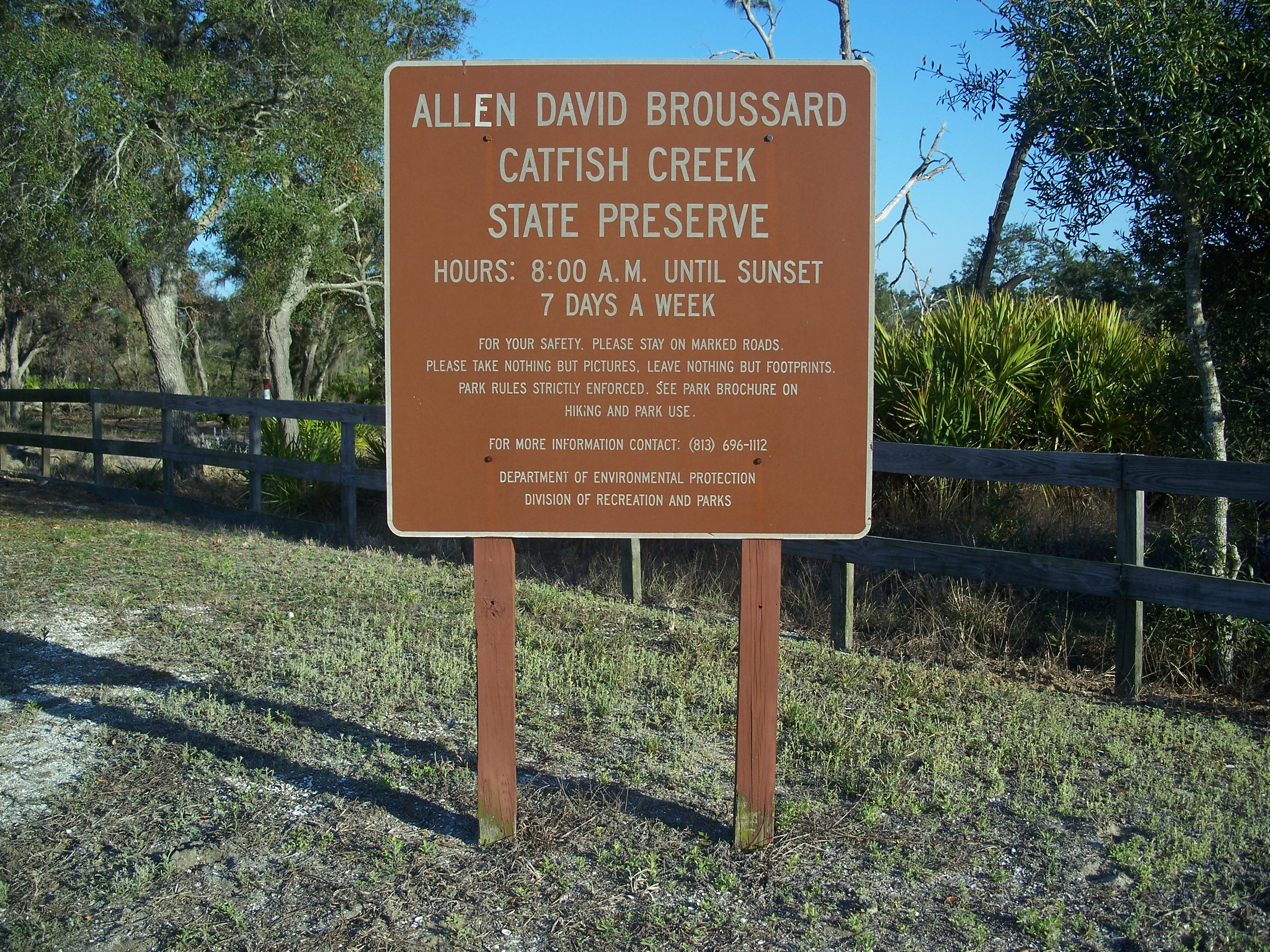
Sign

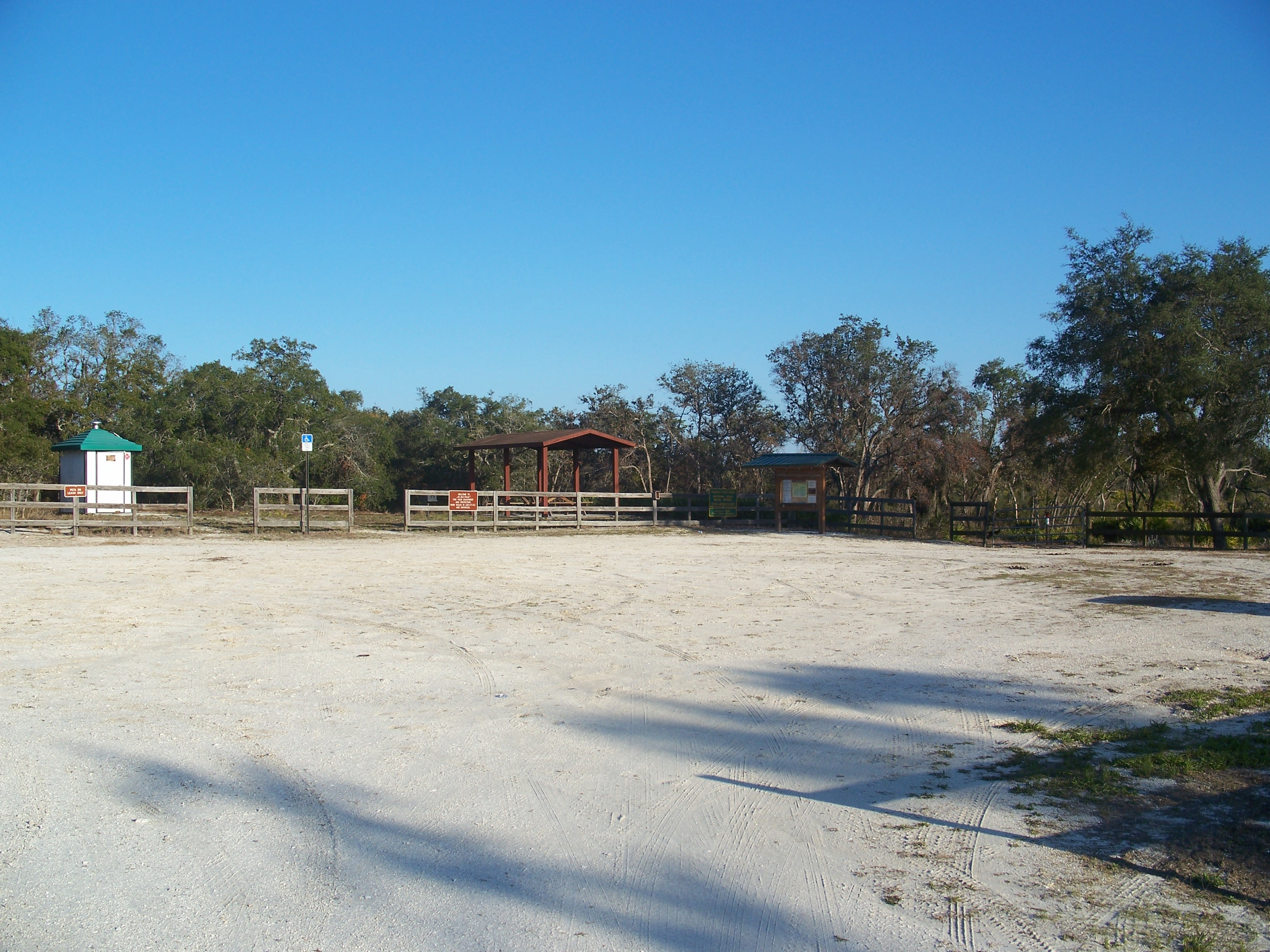
Parking area

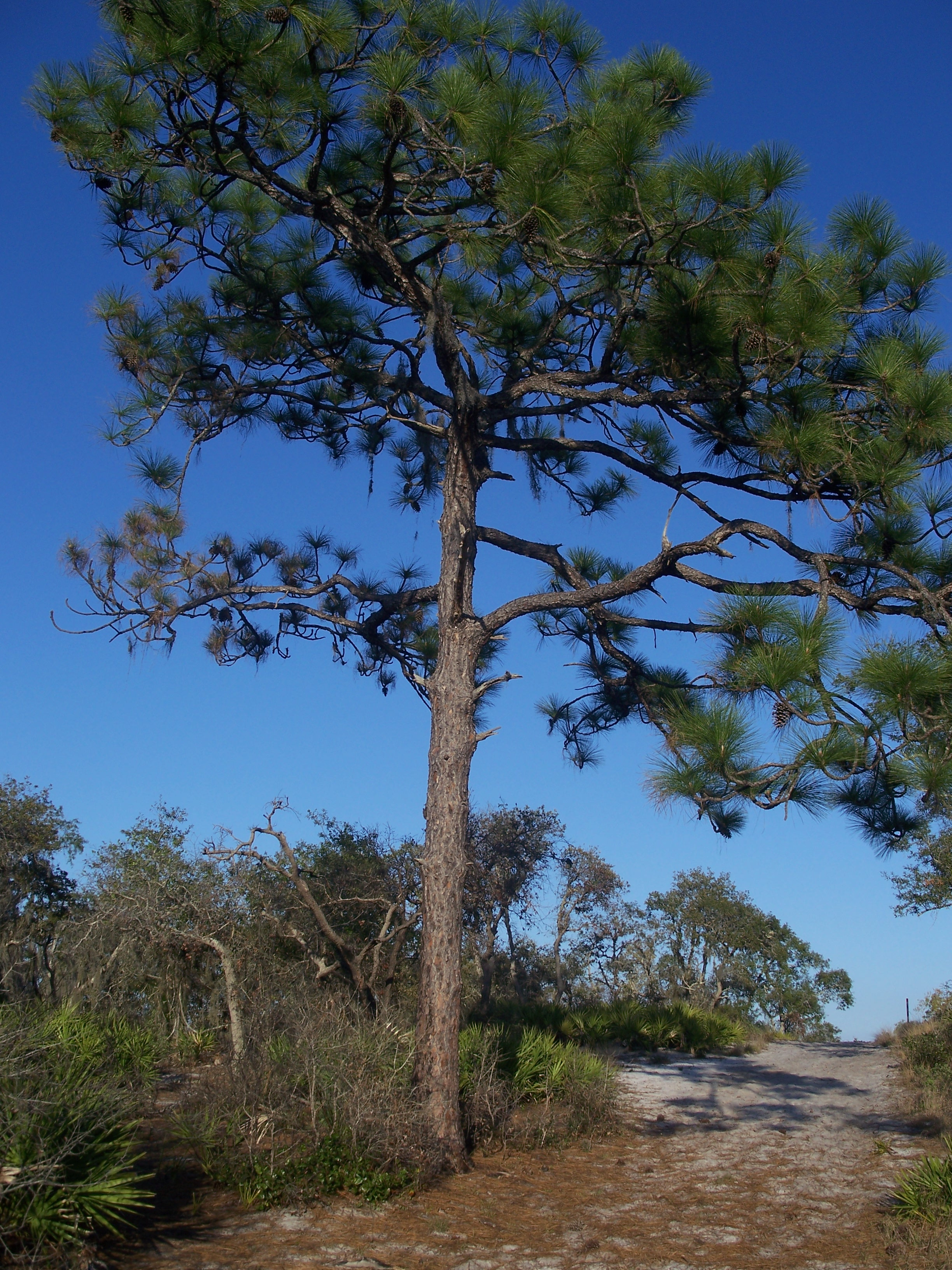
Pine tree

== Sources ==
- FDEP staff (2026). Catfish Creek (PDF). 2026 Florida Forever Plan (Report). Tallahassee, Florida: Florida Department of Environmental Protection.
