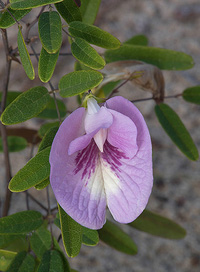

Conservation status
- Imperiled (NatureServe)

Scientific classification
- Kingdom: Plantae
- Clade: Tracheophytes
- Clade: Angiosperms
- Clade: Eudicots
- Clade: Rosids
- Order: Fabales
- Family: Fabaceae
- Subfamily: Faboideae
- Genus: Clitoria
- Species: C. fragrans

Binomial name
- Clitoria fragrans Small

Synonyms
- Clitoria pinetorum

= Clitoria fragrans =

Species of legume

Clitoria fragrans is a rare species of flowering plant in the legume family known by the common name pigeon wings, or sweet-scented pigeon wings. It is endemic to Central Florida, where it was known most recently from an estimated 58 occurrences, but no current estimates of the total global population are available. The plant is a federally listed threatened species of the United States.

== Characteristics ==
It a perennial herb or subshrub which grows up to half a meter tall from a woody taproot, sometimes reaching one meter. The slender, purplish, slightly waxy-textured stems have leaves alternately arranged. Each leaf has three elongated oblong or lance-shaped, bristle-tipped green leaflets each up to 4.5 centimeters in length. The inflorescences occur in leaf axils, each bearing one or two fragrant blooms. The flower may be up to 5 cm long and is mostly pale pinkish purple with darker rose-pink streaks at the center and a white spot below. The flower is resupinated, with the reproductive parts curving around to point toward the back of the corolla; this forces a visiting insect to rub against them and thereby transfer pollen. A second type of flower often occurs which is cleistogamous: self-pollinating, and not actually opening into a corolla. The cleistogamous flower is more common in general, but the type with the showy open corolla may be more common in the seasons after a wildfire. Both types bear fruit, a legume pod up to 5 cm long containing up to 9 reddish seeds a few millimeters in length. The seeds are sticky in texture and are dispersed when they adhere to animals.

== Habitat ==
This plant grows in undisturbed areas in Florida scrub habitat, often in the transition between scrub and sandhill areas. It prefers open habitat where it is not shaded by tall woody vegetation. Periodic wildfire is common in this type of habitat in its natural state, a process which keeps the taller vegetation from shading smaller herbs and shrubs. The deeply rooting taproot helps the plant to survive fires and then resprout. The plant grows in dry upland areas of the scrub in white, yellow, and gray sand types.

This plant is known from several widely scattered populations. Many of these are located on protected land within the bounds of Seminole State Forest, Lake Wales Ridge State Forest and National Wildlife Refuge, and Allen David Broussard Catfish Creek State Park. Many occurrences are located on the Avon Park Air Force Range, where the military is required to monitor them because of the species' federally threatened status.

== Endangered status ==
Habitat destruction and fragmentation is a threat to this plant and other Florida scrub natives; much of the Florida scrub has been destroyed to make room for residential development and agricultural operations such as orange groves. Another threat is predation. The plant is apparently very attractive to white-tailed deer and eastern cottontails, which consume the herbage, and it plays host to many butterfly species, including long-tailed skipper (Urbanus proteus) and southern cloudywing (Thorybes bathyllus). The seeds appear to be consumed quite often, possibly by beetles.
