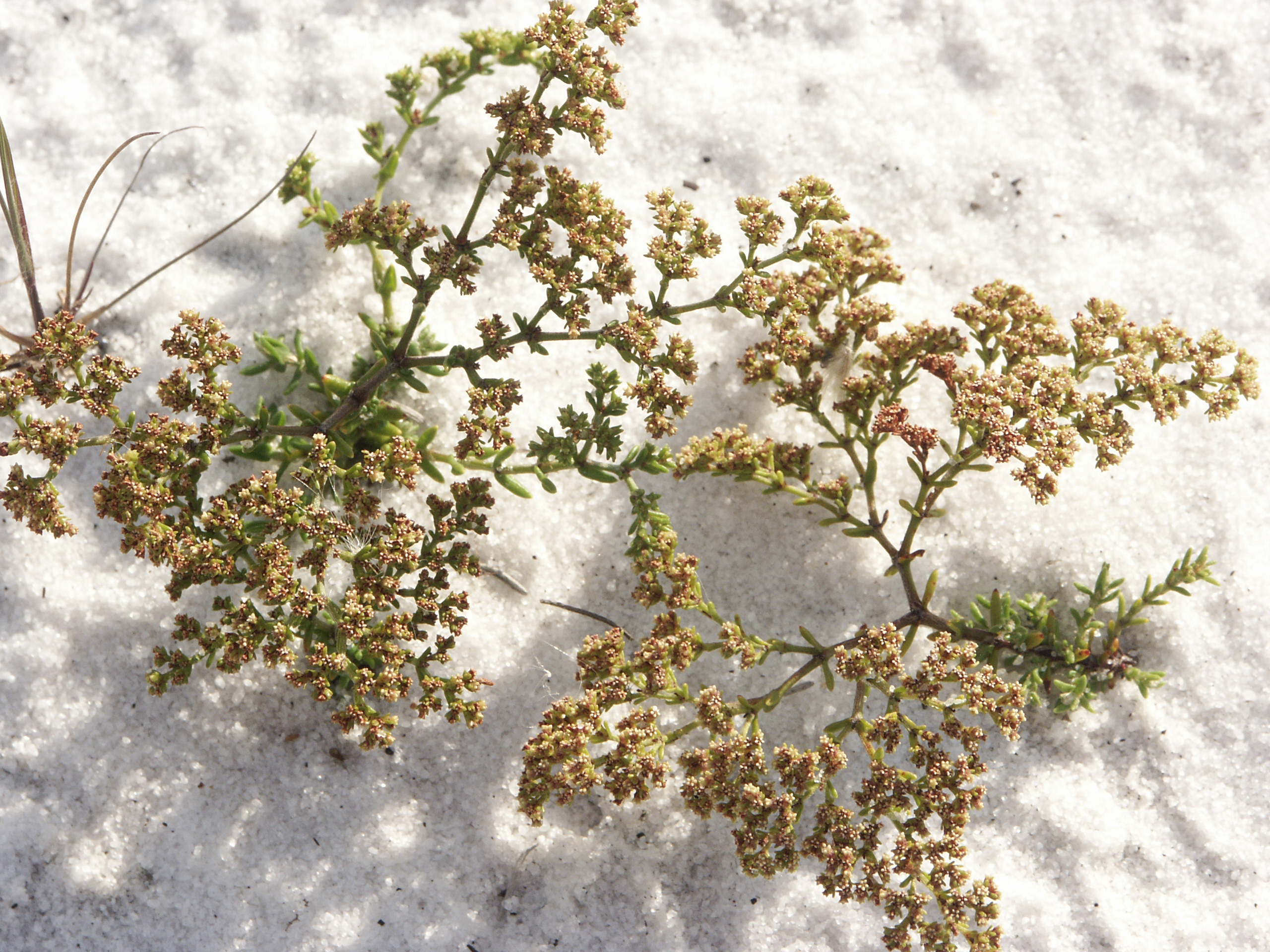
- P. chartacea in the white sand of the Florida scrub

Conservation status
- Vulnerable (NatureServe)

Scientific classification
- Kingdom: Plantae
- Clade: Tracheophytes
- Clade: Angiosperms
- Clade: Eudicots
- Order: Caryophyllales
- Family: Caryophyllaceae
- Genus: Paronychia
- Species: P. chartacea

Binomial name
- Paronychia chartacea Fernald

= Paronychia chartacea =

Species of flowering plant

Paronychia chartacea is a rare species of flowering plant in the family Caryophyllaceae known by the common names papery Whitlow-wort and paper nailwort. It is endemic to Florida in the United States. There are two subspecies of the plant; ssp. chartacea occurs in Central Florida, especially the Lake Wales Ridge, and ssp. minima is native to the Florida Panhandle. The two subspecies are geographically separated and do not occur together. Both are included on the federal Endangered Species List, on which the species is designated threatened.

This is often an annual herb, though ssp. chartacea may be a short-lived perennial. It produces a short, spreading stem that branches many times to take on a mat-like form. The stem is no more than 20 centimeters long. It is lined with occasional small, leathery leaves which are oblong to triangular in form and just a few millimeters long. The ends of the forking stem branches are dense, highly divided cymes of many tiny flowers. The flowers generally have five sepals, stamens, and other parts, but they may have 3 or 4 parts, a trait unique among the North American Paronychia species. The sepals are brownish or purplish fading to thinned, papery, whitish or translucent edges. The fruit is a minute utricle measuring half a millimeter long. The two subspecies differ in size; ssp. minima has a smaller caudex and smaller inflorescences.

This plant grows in small openings in the Florida scrub, where it is an early successional species, likely increasing in number after wildfire clears an overgrown area. It grows in white sand scrub. The Central Florida subspecies, ssp. chartacea, occurs in open areas dominated by rosemary and sand pine, sometimes colonizing recently disturbed habitat. Other plants and lichens in the area include Bonamia grandiflora, Hypericum cumulicola, Polygonella basaramia, Cladonia perforata, Eryngium cuneifolium, and Liatris ohlingerae. The northern subspecies, ssp. minima occurs in the white sand edges of ponds and sinkholes in karst substrate. It is present in Bay and Washington Counties. Though limited in distribution and threatened by the loss of its natural ecosystem, the plant can be locally common in fragments of remaining habitat.

The main threat to the species is the destruction and degradation of the Florida scrub. This type of habitat is being consumed for development and conversion to agriculture, such as new citrus groves. Remaining strips of scrub are degraded in quality because of fire suppression. The scrub depends on periodic wildfire for its maintenance; without a normal fire regime it becomes overgrown and experiences succession, during which the herb layer is outcompeted and shaded out by larger and woody vegetation, and the open, sunny scrub becomes a forest. Some remaining scrub is managed properly to prevent this succession, and it is here that rare herbs such as the nailwort persist. It is one of many rare local endemic plants that survive on the Lake Wales Ridge, part of which is protected and stewarded. Protected areas are located in Highlands, Polk, Lake, and Orange Counties.
