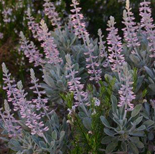

Conservation status
- Endangered (ESA)

Scientific classification
- Kingdom: Plantae
- Clade: Tracheophytes
- Clade: Angiosperms
- Clade: Eudicots
- Clade: Rosids
- Order: Fabales
- Family: Fabaceae
- Subfamily: Faboideae
- Genus: Lupinus
- Species: L. aridorum

Binomial name
- Lupinus aridorum McFarlin ex Beckner

= Lupinus aridorum =

Species of legume

Lupinus aridorum is a rare species of lupine known by the common name scrub lupine. It is endemic to Florida in the United States, where there were 10 known populations remaining in 2003. Fewer than 6000 individual plants were counted. It is threatened by the loss and degradation of its habitat. The scrub lupine is a federally listed endangered species of the United States.

This plant was first collected in 1900, but it was not described until 1982 to science as a species. It is often treated as a variety of Lupinus westianus.

The scrub lupine is a biennial or perennial herb growing up to a meter tall. The leaves are oval with pointed tips, not palmate as in most other lupines. Each leaf blade may be up to 7 centimeters long by 4 wide and is borne on a long petiole. The herbage is coated in silvery hairs. The inflorescence is a raceme-like spike of flowers up to 15 centimeters long borne on an erect stalk up to 13 centimeters in length. Each pealike flower is between 1 and 2 centimeters long and pale pink in color with a darker spot on the standard, or top, petal. The fruit is a hairy legume pod about 2 centimeters long. The plant is known to reach seven feet in diameter. The scrub lupine is easily identified in its habitat, being the only upright-growing lupine that has pink flowers.

The plant grows in the Florida scrub of Central Florida. It grows in well-drained white sand, or sometimes yellow sand, among sand pines (Pinus clausa). Other trees in the habitat may include slash pine (Pinus elliottii) and turkey oak (Quercus laevis). Shrubs in the understory include the Florida rosemary (Ceratiola ericoides), scrub live oak (Quercus geminata), and rusty lyonia (Lyonia ferruginea).

The Florida scrub is a highly endangered habitat type, and the lupine is mainly found in degraded strips or in areas that are in danger of being destroyed for development. The only known populations are in Orange and Polk Counties, areas of rapid growth and rapid loss of natural habitat. When it was listed under the Endangered Species Act, the lupine was only found on private property which could not be protected. Since the last count in 2003, three to four of the 10 known populations have likely been extirpated. Some sites are protected today, including at least one within the Lake Wales Ridge National Wildlife Refuge; this is the only site that is guaranteed long-term protection from development.

The main threat to the species is the loss of its habitat to development and the improper management of remaining habitat. When it was listed, most of the occurrences were located between Orlando, Florida, and the Walt Disney World complex, an area of busy growth. Land is being cleared for housing developments and related utilities, such as roads, and because most of the occurrences are still privately owned, they could be cleared at any time. Remaining habitat is affected by fire suppression. The Florida scrub is an ecosystem which depends on a normal regime of periodic wildfires for maintenance. Fire is largely prevented today in an effort to protect property, so the scrub lands become overgrown and plants, such as the lupine, that require open, bare spots for sunlight become shaded out. Most of the lupine's habitat is now degraded because it has gone without fire or mechanical removal of brush and vegetation.

Other threats include wilt, a disease caused by the bacterium Xylella fastidiosa.

A recovery project is under way in Polk and Orange counties. The project involves planting seedlings propagated at the Rare Plant Conservation Program nursery at Bok Tower in Lake Wales. The first planting occurred at Lake Blue Scrub in Winter Haven in December 2008. Subsequent plantings have occurred at three other sites. The hope is that eventually the plants will produce enough seeds that will germinate and produce a sustainable wild population, but the results will remain unknown for several years.

The Scrub Lupine is sometimes called McFarlin's Lupine in honor of James Brigham McFarlin, a Winter Haven botanist who collected specimens in the 1930s and is thought to be the first person to suggest that it be described as a separate species. (See Notes On The Life and Work of James Brigham McFarlin, Florida Botanist Sida 22(1):607-613 2006)
