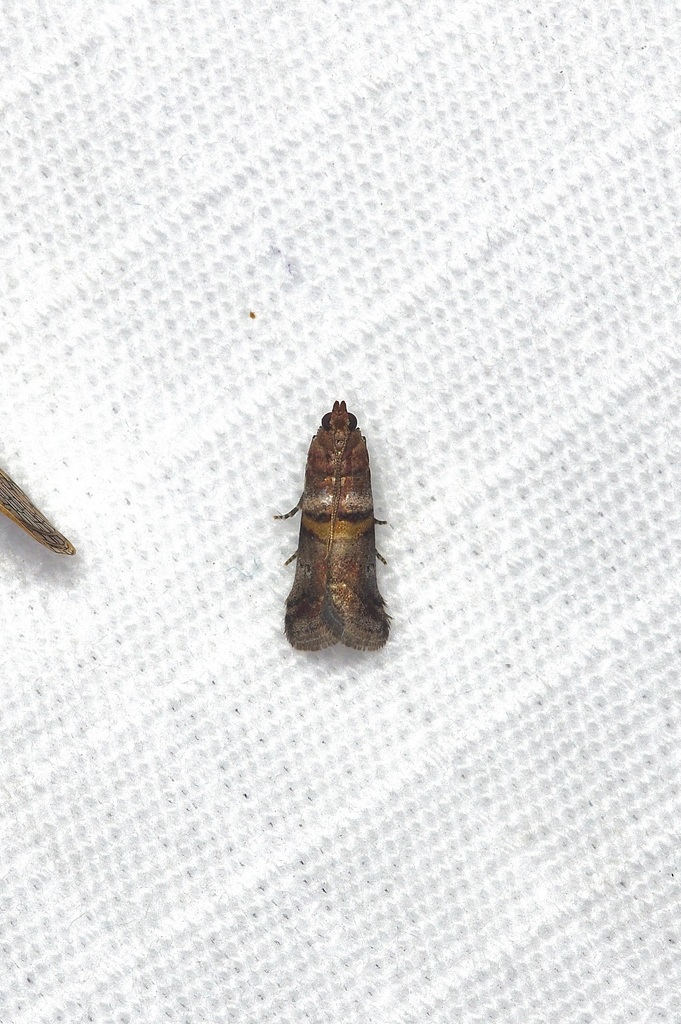

Scientific classification
- Kingdom: Animalia
- Phylum: Arthropoda
- Clade: Pancrustacea
- Class: Insecta
- Order: Lepidoptera
- Family: Pyralidae
- Genus: Acrobasis
- Species: A. minimella

Binomial name
- Acrobasis minimella Ragonot, 1889

Synonyms
- Acrobasis nigrosignella Hulst, 1890

= Acrobasis minimella =

Species of moth

Acrobasis minimella is a species of snout moth in the genus Acrobasis. It was described by Émile Louis Ragonot in 1889, and is known from the eastern United States.

The wingspan is about 17 mm.

The larvae feed on Quercus species, including Quercus marilandica, Quercus velutina, Quercus rubra, Quercus falcata, Quercus laevis and Quercus alba.
