= Ataenius alternatus =

Scientific classification
- Kingdom: Animalia
- Phylum: Arthropoda
- Clade: Pancrustacea
- Class: Insecta
- Order: Coleoptera
- Suborder: Polyphaga
- Infraorder: Scarabaeiformia
- Family: Scarabaeidae
- Genus: Ataenius
- Species: A. alternatus

Binomial name
- Ataenius alternatus (Melsheimer, 1845)

Synonyms
- Oxyomus alternatus Melsheimer, 1845; Oxyomus alternans Dejean, 1833

Species of beetle

Ataenius alternatus is a species of aphodiine dung beetle in the family Scarabaeidae. It is found in the United States (Alabama, Florida, Georgia, Indiana, Louisiana, Mississippi, North Carolina, Pennsylvania, South Carolina, Texas) and Mexico (Chiapas).

== Description ==
Adults reach a length of about 4–4.8 mm (0.16–0.19 in). They have an elongate, slightly convex body, with the surface tightly covered with a greyish brown argillaceous coating.

== Life history ==
Specimens have been collected beneath weed debris near water and from Pinus clausa litter and mahogany butress debris.
