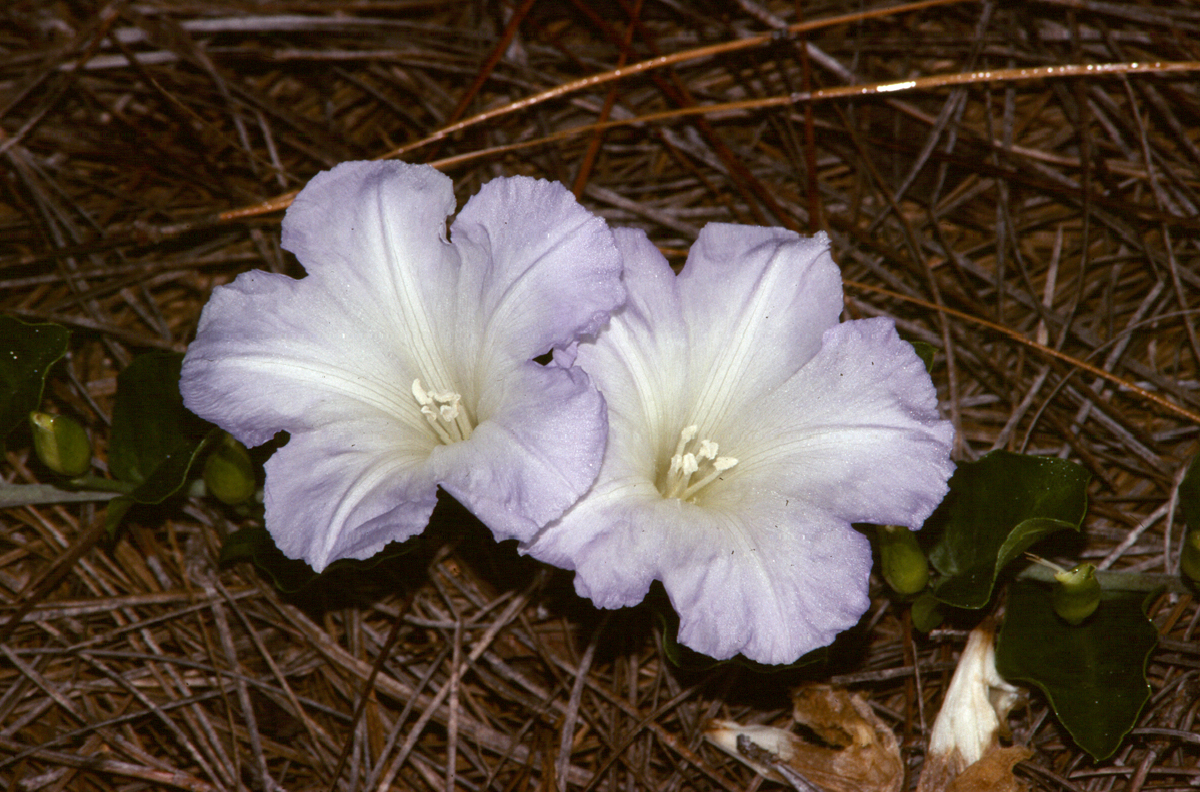

Conservation status
- Vulnerable (NatureServe)

Scientific classification
- Kingdom: Plantae
- Clade: Tracheophytes
- Clade: Angiosperms
- Clade: Eudicots
- Clade: Asterids
- Order: Solanales
- Family: Convolvulaceae
- Genus: Bonamia
- Species: B. grandiflora

Binomial name
- Bonamia grandiflora (A.Gray) Hallier f.

= Bonamia grandiflora =

Species of flowering plant

Bonamia grandiflora is a species of flowering plant in the morning glory family known by the common names Florida lady's nightcap, Florida bonamia, and scrub morning glory. It is endemic to Central Florida, where there are about 100 known populations remaining, many of which are within the bounds of the Ocala National Forest. The plant has declined in recent decades primarily due to the development of its habitat, which is being converted to urban zones and citrus groves. This is the primary reason that the plant was federally listed as a threatened species in 1987.

This native Florida wildflower is a perennial vine which trails along the ground to a maximum length around 3 meters. There is a deep root and multiple underground stems. The hairy stem is lined with leathery, gray-green leaves up to 5 centimeters long. The inflorescence is a single showy flower borne on a short, erect peduncle. The flower corolla opens in the morning, spreading 7 or 8 centimeters wide and up to 10 centimeters long. It is pale to bright blue-purple with a white throat. At the center of the funnel-shaped corolla are five stamens tipped with yellow anthers. The fruit is a capsule around a centimeter in length containing a few seeds.

The plant occurs in Florida scrub habitat on deep, dry, white sand in clearings among sand pines (Pinus clausa) and other scrub flora. Other rare plants in the region include highlands scrub hypericum (Hypericum cumulicola), papery whitlow-wort (Paronychia chartacea), scrub plum (Prunus geniculata), and scrub lupine (Lupinus aridorum). It is adapted to the occasional wildfire that naturally occurs in the scrub habitat. Fire clears brush and heavy forest canopy which shade out the morning glory, providing the clearings that it requires. Fire suppression efforts are generally detrimental to the species. Controlled burns and other methods of clearing excessive vegetation are part of the recovery plan. Where the morning glory is provided appropriate habitat, it can become plentiful and even abundant. It has the capacity to introduce itself into newly cleared, sandy plots and take hold vigorously; however, it does not tolerate much disturbance once established.
