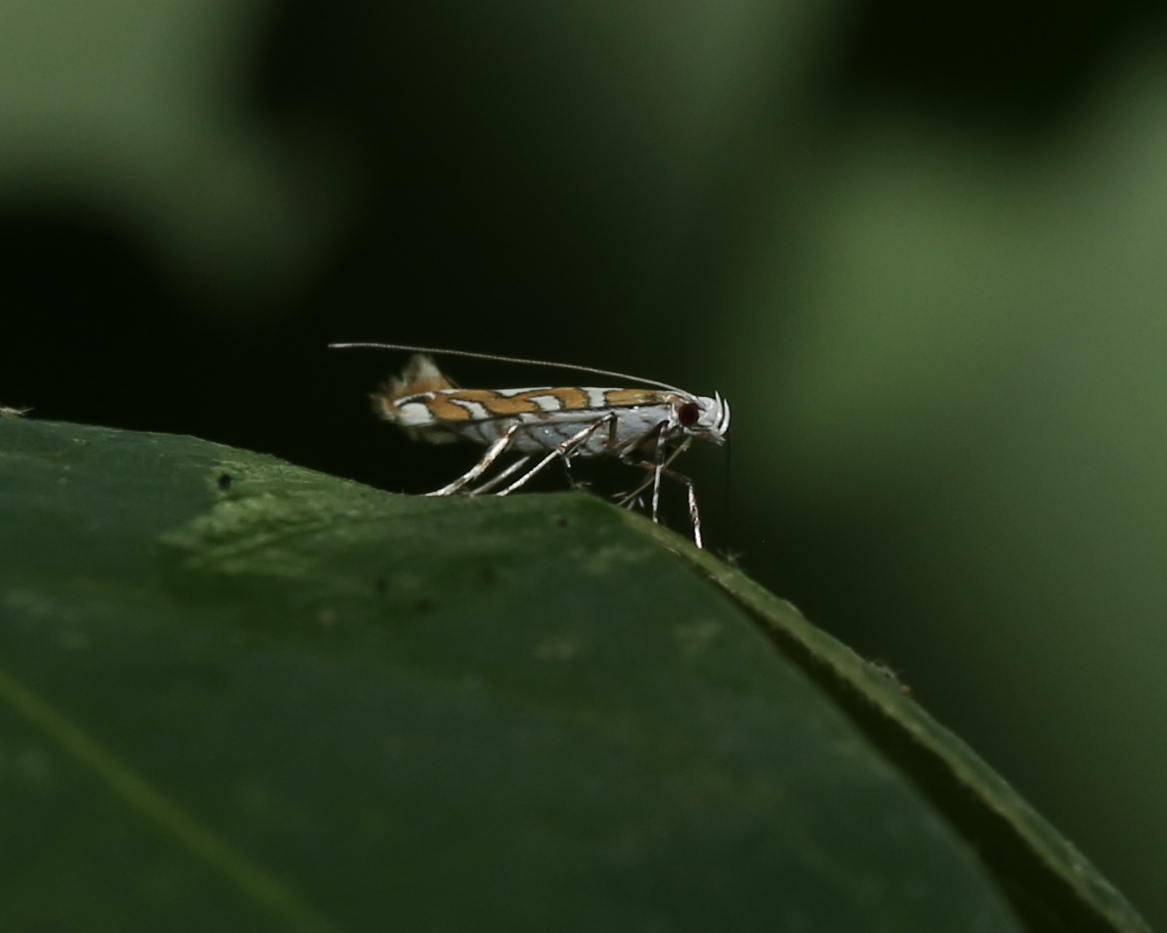

Scientific classification
- Kingdom: Animalia
- Phylum: Arthropoda
- Clade: Pancrustacea
- Class: Insecta
- Order: Lepidoptera
- Family: Gracillariidae
- Genus: Acrocercops
- Species: A. albinatella

Binomial name
- Acrocercops albinatella (Chambers, 1872)

Synonyms
- Acrocercops albanotella (Chambers, 1877); Acrocercops albinotella Meyrick, 1912

= Acrocercops albinatella =

Species of moth

Acrocercops albinatella is a moth of the family Gracillariidae, known from Quebec and the United States (including Maryland, New York, Maine, North Carolina, Georgia, Florida, Missouri, Ohio, Kentucky and Texas).

Adults are on wing in late June and early July in central Illinois.

The hostplants for the species include Quercus alba, Quercus laevis, Quercus obtusiloba, Quercus rubra, and Quercus stellata. They mine the leaves of their host plant. The mine starts as a long, winding, Nepticulid-like mine ending in a large, tentiform mine on the underside of the leaf.
