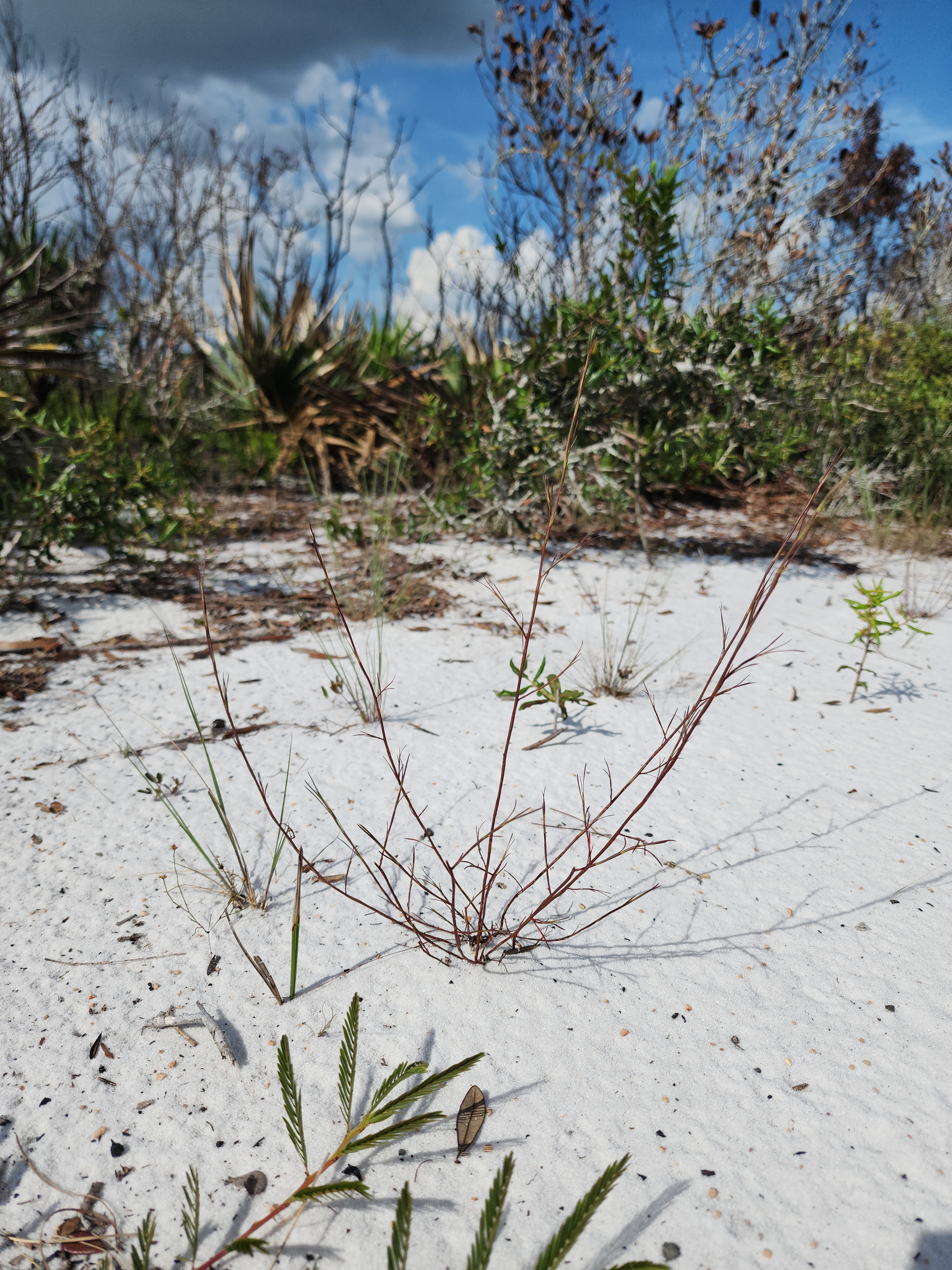
- Regrowing in sparsely-vegetated gap in white sand scrub after a recent fire

Conservation status
- Vulnerable (NatureServe)

Scientific classification
- Kingdom: Plantae
- Clade: Tracheophytes
- Clade: Angiosperms
- Clade: Eudicots
- Order: Caryophyllales
- Family: Polygonaceae
- Genus: Polygonum
- Species: P. basiramia

Binomial name
- Polygonum basiramia (Small) T.M.Schust. & Reveal

Synonyms
- Delopyrum basiramia Small; Polygonella basiramia (Small) G.L.Nesom & V.M.Bates; Polygonella ciliata var. basiramia (Small) Horton

= Polygonum basiramia =

Species of flowering plant

Polygonum basiramia (synonym Polygonella basiramia) is a rare species of flowering plant in the knotweed family known by the common names wireweed, hairy wireweed, purple wireweed, and Florida jointweed. It is endemic to Florida in the United States, where it is limited to the central ridges of the peninsula, including the Lake Wales Ridge. It is threatened by the loss and degradation of its habitat. It is a federally listed endangered species of the United States.

== Description ==
This plant is a perennial herb growing 30 to 80 centimeters tall. The roots of the plant may be much longer than the plant's diameter and spread out under the soil. The wiry stems may branch and may extend beneath the surface of the soil. The plant only has leaves for a short time. They are linear in shape and measure no more than 2 or 3 centimeters in length. The stem and leaves are red to green in color. The plant is gynodioecious, with some individuals producing bisexual flowers and some producing only female. The inflorescence, measuring 1 to 3 centimeters long, contains white to pinkish flowers under 2 millimeters long. Blooming occurs around September and fruit production may last until December. The flowers are pollinated by Perdita polygonellae, a bee which specializes in the plant subsection Polygonella, and wasps of the family Eumenidae. Female plants produce many more seeds than do hermaphrodite plants. The seeds are very tiny, measuring about 7 by 28 micrometers. The species appears to be resistant to the allelopathic chemicals released into the soil by Florida rosemary.

== Taxonomy ==
The species was first described in 1820 by John Kunkel Small as Delopyrum basiramia. It was later placed in the genus Polygonella (under the name Polygonella basiramia), but in 2015, following a series of molecular phylogenetic studies, this genus was subsumed into Polygonum.

== Distribution and habitat ==
This plant is a member of the Florida scrub plant community. It occurs in scrub dominated by Florida rosemary, sand pine, other pines, and oaks. The soil is almost entirely composed of sand and it holds little water or nutrients. The plant occurs in openings in the scrub which are maintained by periodic wildfires. Other plants in this habitat include Calamintha ashei, Cnidoscolus stimulosus, Eryngium cuneifolium, Euphorbia floridana, Hypericum cumulicola, Lechea cernua, Licania michauxii, Paronychia chartacea, Polanisia tenuifolia, Polygonum polygama, Selaginella arenicola, and Stipulicida setacea.

== Conservation ==
Threats to this species include the destruction of its habitat during the conversion to residential and agricultural property, particularly citrus groves. Off-road vehicles are a threat to the habitat. Fire suppression may have a negative effect on this plant, which grows in open gaps in a fire-maintained ecosystem, but the species appears to be less dependent on fire than many other Florida scrub endemics.

Many plants in this altered, fragmented region are rare and endangered. Wireweed is one of the more abundant of these, and it can be common in some local areas. As of 2010 there were 119 extant occurrences of the plant for an estimated total exceeding one million individuals. However, it is limited to a very endangered habitat type, putting it in danger of decline.
