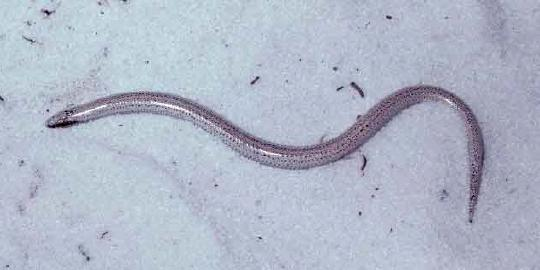

Conservation status
- Vulnerable (IUCN 3.1)

- Vulnerable (NatureServe)

Scientific classification
- Kingdom: Animalia
- Phylum: Chordata
- Class: Reptilia
- Order: Squamata
- Family: Scincidae
- Genus: Plestiodon
- Species: P. reynoldsi

Binomial name
- Plestiodon reynoldsi (Stejneger, 1910)
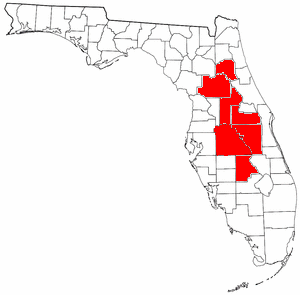
- Florida sand skink range

Synonyms
- Neoseps reynoldsi Stejneger, 1910; Eumeces (Pariocela) reynoldsi — Schmitz et al., 2004; Plestiodon reynoldsi — Schmitz et al., 2004

= Florida sand skink =

Species of reptile

The Florida sand skink (Plestiodon reynoldsi) is a species of lizard in the family Scincidae, the skinks. It is endemic to Florida in the United States.

== Taxonomy and etymology ==
It was described as a new genus and new species by Leonhard Stejneger in 1910 and named in honor of a certain Mr. A.G. Reynolds of Gulfport, Florida, who had collected the holotype.

== Description ==
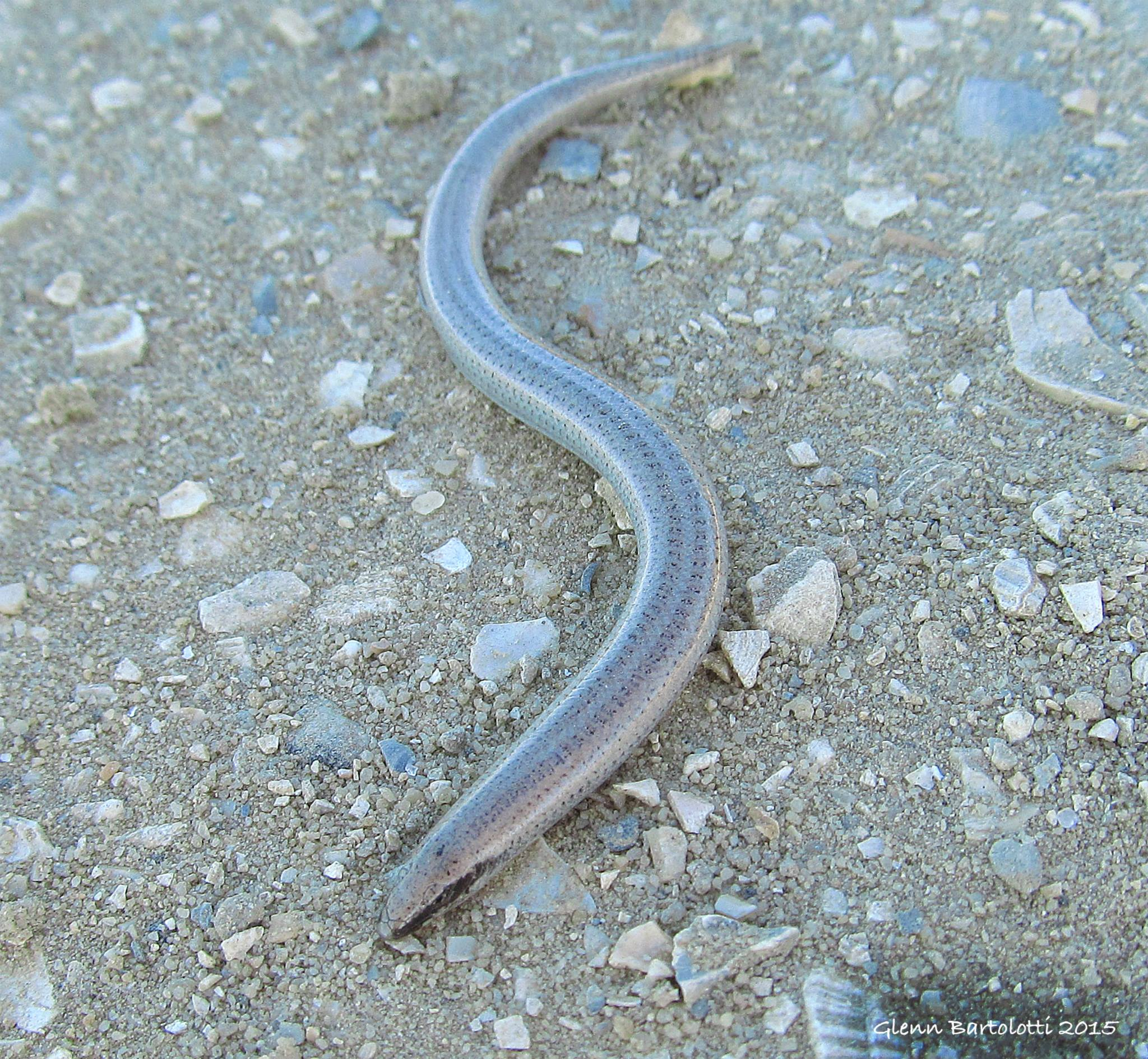
In Highlands County, Florida

A unique lizard adapted to an underground existence, the Florida sand skink measures 10 to 13 cm (4 to 5 in) in total length and is a gray to tan color. Its forelegs are tiny and bear only one toe each; its hindlegs are small and have two toes. The tail comprises about half of the animal's total length. The sand skink has a wedge-shaped head, a partially countersunk lower jaw, body grooves into which the forelegs can be folded, and small eyes which have transparent windows in the lower lids. These features enable the lizard to move through loose sand.

== Diet ==
The diet consists of surface-dwelling invertebrates, including termites, spiders, and the larvae of antlions and beetles. It is currently unknown of its diet includes any of the poorly studied regional endemic Florida scrub arthropods such as the Lake Placid funnel wolf spider (Sosippus placidus Brady, 1972), which itself is a species of conservation concern.

== Reproduction ==
Florida sand skinks are most active in spring, during their mating season. They reach sexual maturity after one to two years and remain reproductively active for two to three years. About 55 days after mating, the female lays about two eggs, which hatch in June or July.

== Geographic range ==
It only occurs in Central Florida—115 known sites were recorded in 1999. The species is difficult to detect and may be found elsewhere during more intensive searches. It is present on the Lake Wales Ridge, the Winter Haven Ridge in Polk County, and the Mount Dora Ridge.

== Habitat ==
The Florida sand skink lives in areas vegetated with sand pine–Florida rosemary scrub and the longleaf pine–American turkey oak association, including Florida scrub habitat. Food supply and moisture levels are important factors in the species' tolerance of habitat. Florida sand skinks are most frequently found in the ecotone between Florida rosemary scrub and palmetto-pine flatwoods where moisture is present beneath the surface litter and in the sand.

== Behavior ==
It usually remains underground and burrows 5–10 cm (2.0–3.9 in) beneath the soil to find food.

== Conservation status ==
The Florida sand skink was classified as a threatened species by the United States Fish and Wildlife Service in 1987. As of 2016 it is classified as vulnerable by the IUCN due to ongoing habitat destruction for the purpose of building developments, citrus plantations, phosphate mining, and wildfires.
