= Maidencane =

Maidencane is a common name for several plants and may refer to:

- Amphicarpum, native to the eastern United States
- Panicum hemitomon, native to North America
