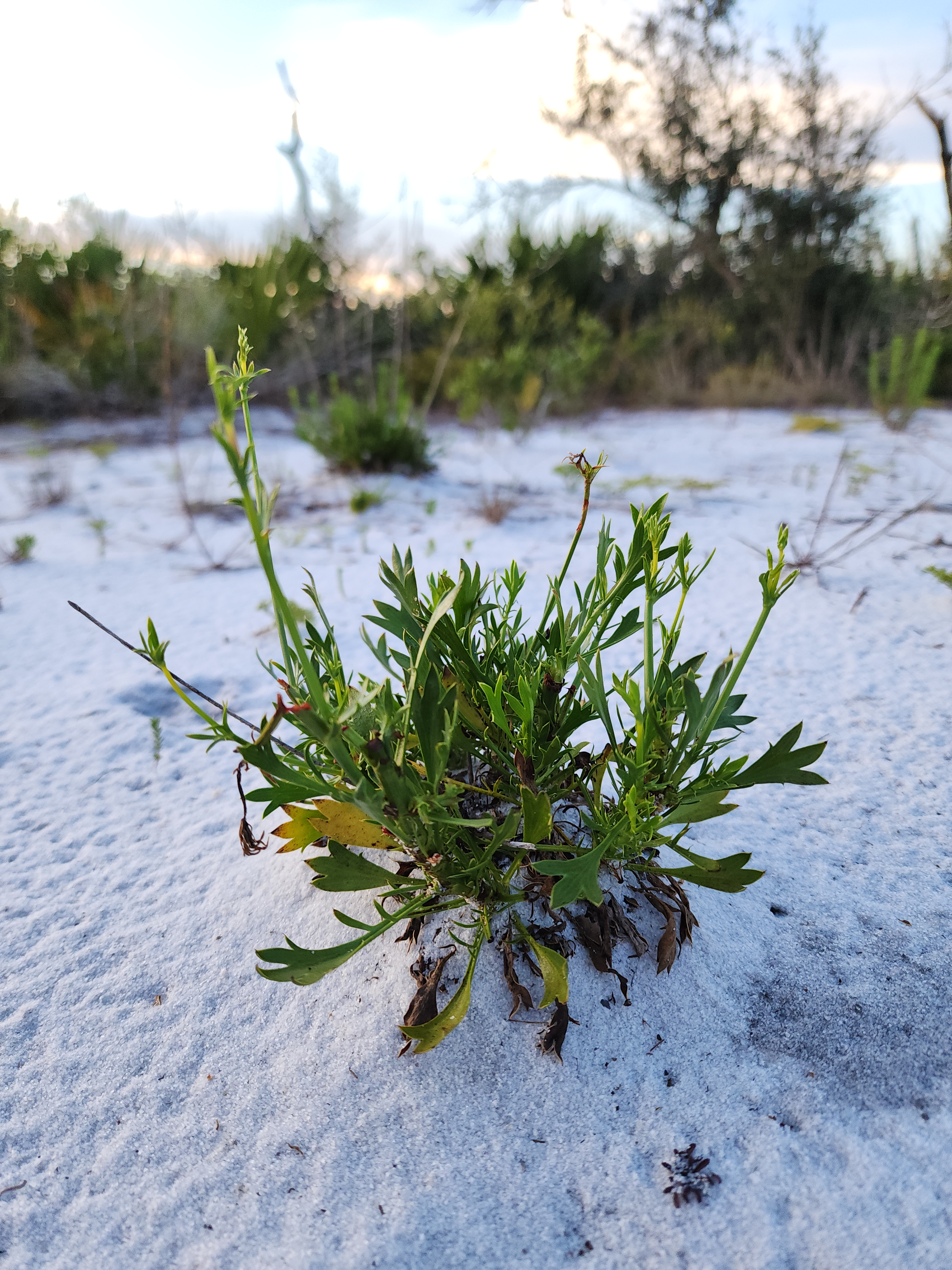
- Growing in sparsely-vegetated gap in white sand scrub

Conservation status
- Critically Imperiled (NatureServe)

Scientific classification
- Kingdom: Plantae
- Clade: Tracheophytes
- Clade: Angiosperms
- Clade: Eudicots
- Clade: Asterids
- Order: Apiales
- Family: Apiaceae
- Genus: Eryngium
- Species: E. cuneifolium

Binomial name
- Eryngium cuneifolium Small

= Eryngium cuneifolium =

Species of flowering plant in the celery family

Eryngium cuneifolium is a rare species of flowering plant in the carrot family known by the common names wedgeleaf eryngo, wedge-leaved button-snakeroot, and simply snakeroot. It is endemic to the state of Florida in the United States where it is known only from Highlands County. It is one of many rare species that can be found only on the Lake Wales Ridge, an area of high endemism. It was federally listed as an endangered species of the United States in 1987.

This is an erect perennial herb growing 20 to 66 centimeters in maximum height. The woody taproot may be over 20 centimeters long. The distinctive leaves are wedge-shaped with usually three bristle-tipped teeth at the tips. The basal leaves are largest and there are a few smaller ones along the erect flowering stem. The herbage is aromatic. The inflorescence is a compound umbel of several dense headlike clusters of flowers. Each individual flower has five sharp-pointed sepals, making the clusters bristly. The flowers have white, or possibly blue, or greenish flowers. Blooming occurs in July through January, but especially August through October.

This is a plant of the Florida scrub. It grows in bare stretches of white sand, including gaps in the rosemary and sand pine scrub and in blowouts. The land is dry and the bare, sunny gaps in the scrub are maintained by periodic wildfire. Other plants in the habitat include silk bay (Persea humilis), scrub palmetto (Sabal etonia), eastern prickly pear (Opuntia humifusa), and several species of oak.

There are 19 known occurrences of this plant, all within one Florida county. Eight are on protected land, such as the Lake Wales Ridge Wildlife Area. The other 11 are on private, unprotected land. Their status is not certain, but four of these occurrences are believed extirpated or on the verge of destruction. Remaining stretches of Florida scrub such as that inhabited by the snakeroot are vulnerable to destruction. Much of it has been consumed for development and for agriculture, especially citrus groves. Habitat that remains is in a fragmented condition. In many areas, including some of the protected regions, the land is not properly managed to maintain the natural habitat. The Florida scrub is a fire-prone landscape and many of the plants require fire every few decades to thrive. This snakeroot, for example, requires periodic disturbance such as fire to clear out tall and woody vegetation that grows up around it and blocks the sun. The plant requires wide open habitat for survival, and plants located farther from other shrubs grow more successfully. Fire suppression, which is practiced to prevent property damage, prevents this disturbance and leads to overgrowth of the scrub.

This species also needs fire in order to germinate, because excessive leaf litter and lichen cover on the ground inhibit this process. The snakeroot population skyrockets after the scrub is burned, and its survival, growth, and fecundity are increased. During fire, the plant is destroyed, but its soil seed bank is exposed for germination, and many seedlings occur. The plant has a limited capacity for dispersal, and most seeds end up in the ground near the parent plant. Germination also may be inhibited by the scrub rosemary, which produces allelopathic compounds.
