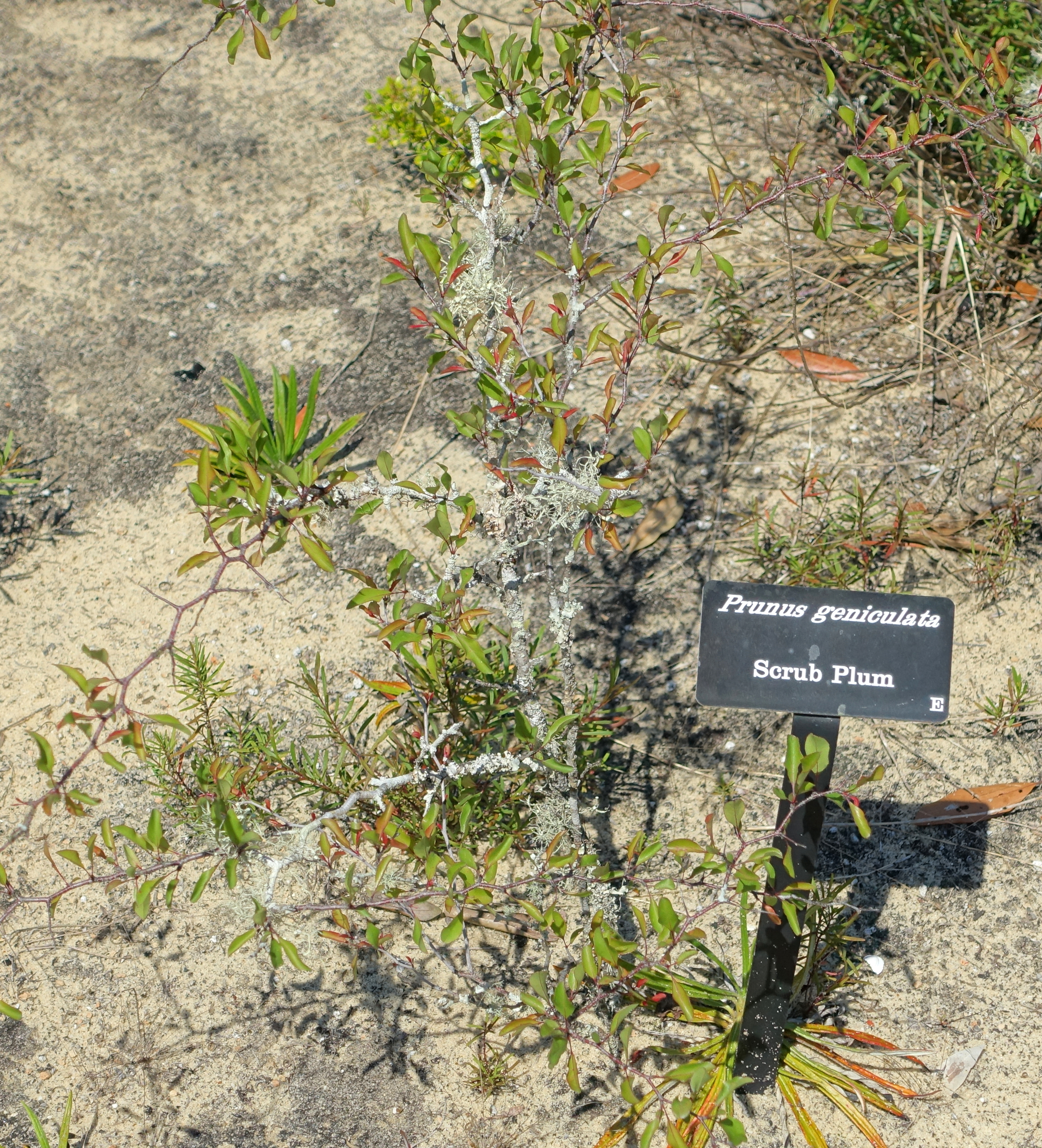
- Bok Tower Gardens

Conservation status
- Vulnerable (NatureServe)

Scientific classification
- Kingdom: Plantae
- Clade: Embryophytes
- Clade: Tracheophytes
- Clade: Angiosperms
- Clade: Eudicots
- Clade: Rosids
- Order: Rosales
- Family: Rosaceae
- Genus: Prunus
- Subgenus: Prunus subg. Prunus
- Section: Prunus sect. Prunocerasus
- Species: P. geniculata

Binomial name
- Prunus geniculata R.M.Harper

= Prunus geniculata =

Species of tree

Prunus geniculata is a rare species of plum known by the common name scrub plum. The species is endemic to Florida.

== Description ==
This plant is a low, rounded shrub with a gnarled trunk emerging from the sand and branching densely. It grows up to 2 meters (6 1/2 feet) tall. The zig-zagging, angled, sharp-tipped branches are sometimes covered in lichens. The bark is reddish-brown, greying and cracking with age, with reddish inner bark. The alternately arranged leaves have smooth blades 1 to 3 centimeters (1/2 to 1 1/4 in) long with wavy or toothed edges.

Blooming occurs before the leaves appear. The flowers are usually solitary. They have red sepals and five white petals a few millimeters long. There are many stamens at the center, with yellow anthers. The species is andromonoecious, with individuals bearing both bisexual and male-only flowers. The fruit is a bitter-tasting, egg-shaped drupe up to 2.5 cm long. The drupe is reddish purple in color.

The plant may be solitary or may grow colonially. Little is known about the plant's life history.

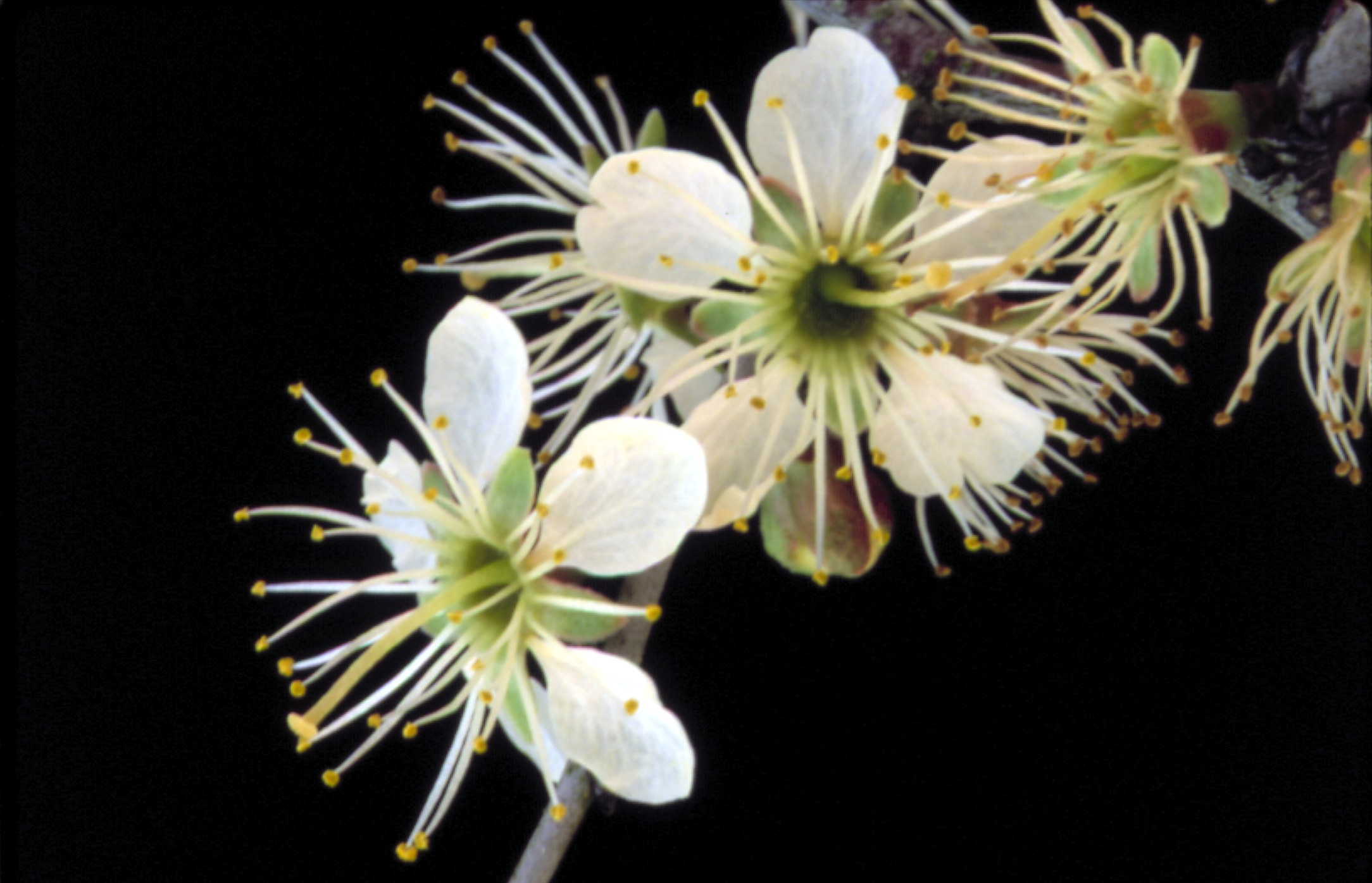
Flowers

== Distribution and habitat ==
The species is endemic to Florida in the United States, where it occurs on the Lake Wales Ridge in the central ridges of the peninsula. It grows in yellow-sand sandhill habitat dominated by longleaf pine and turkey oak and white-sand Florida scrub among sand pine, Florida rosemary, and scrub hickory.

As of 2008 there were 83 populations counted, but 39 of these contained fewer than 10 plants each. Most populations are on the Lake Wales Ridge, and a few are on adjacent ridges. Half the populations are on private land, but most of the large populations are in protected or managed areas.

== Ecology ==
The plant's native habitat is maintained by periodic wildfire. The natural fire regime in the area produces openings in the vegetation, removing woody, overgrown plants in the canopy and creating gaps where the smaller plants can receive sun. This shrub cannot tolerate shade and it thrives when fire clears the vegetation around it. It resprouts from its fibrous root system after its aboveground part burns. Flowering increases in the seasons after a fire, then decreases the longer the area goes unburned. The plant is long-lived, has low mortality, and can survive many years without fire. However, fire suppression is the major threat to the survival of the species. Due to the loss of its habitat, the plant is federally listed as an endangered species of the US.

Another threat to the species is the outright loss of its habitat in the conversion to residential and agricultural properties, including citrus groves. The plant's own biology may contribute to its rarity; germination rates are low and many of the developing fruits are lost before they mature, either to abortion or predation. The species then experiences low recruitment, with few seedlings joining the population.

The drupe is consumed by animals.
