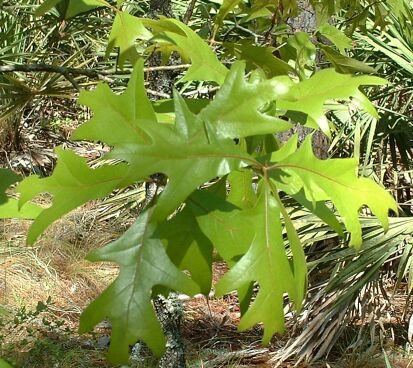
- American turkey oak foliage

Conservation status
- Least Concern (IUCN 3.1)

Scientific classification
- Kingdom: Plantae
- Clade: Embryophytes
- Clade: Tracheophytes
- Clade: Spermatophytes
- Clade: Angiosperms
- Clade: Eudicots
- Clade: Rosids
- Order: Fagales
- Family: Fagaceae
- Genus: Quercus
- Subgenus: Quercus subg. Quercus
- Section: Quercus sect. Lobatae
- Species: Q. laevis

Binomial name
- Quercus laevis Walter
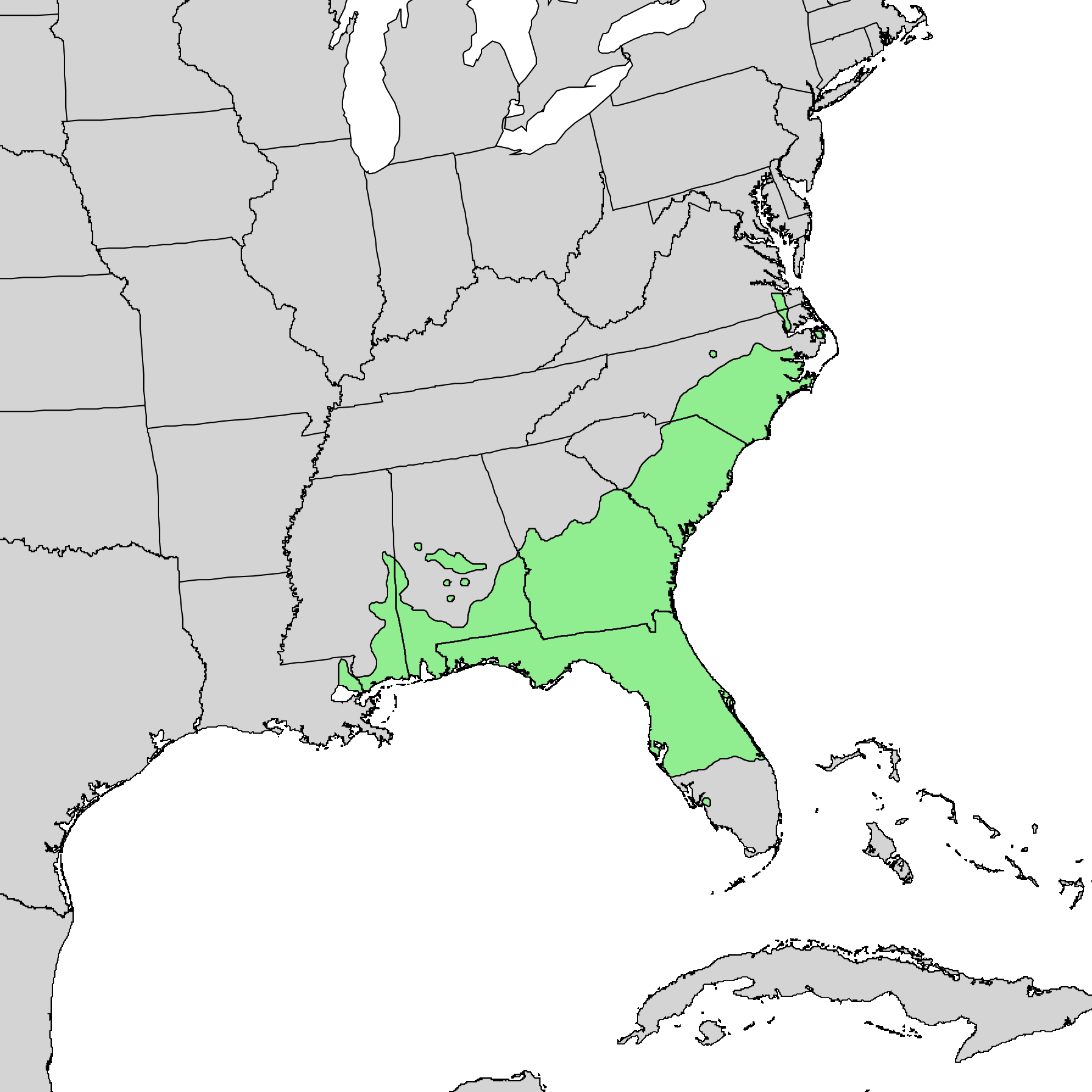
- Quercus laevis native range

Synonyms
- Quercus catesbaei Michx.; Quercus catesbaei f. rappii (Trel.) A.Camus; Quercus laevis f. lineariloba Trel.; Quercus laevis f. rappii Trel.

= Quercus laevis =

Species of oak tree

Quercus laevis, the turkey oak, is a member of the red oak group of oaks. It is native to the southeastern United States. The name turkey oak derives from the resemblance of the leaves to a turkey's foot. A Turkish and southern European species Quercus cerris is also commonly referred to as Turkey oak, so Quercus laevis is sometimes referred to as American turkey oak to distinguish it from the European species.

== Description ==
Quercus laevis is a small tree, sometimes shrubby, typically only 8–10 meters (26–33 feet) tall, though occasionally reaching 28 m (92 ft). The leaves are variable in size, mostly 10–17 centimeters (4–6 3/4 inches) long but occasionally just 8 cm (3 1/4 in) or as much as 30 cm (12 in) long. They have 3–7 slender lobes, deeply incised between the lobes, each lobe with 1–3 bristle teeth at the tip. The leaves turn red in Autumn. The acorns are about 20–25 millimeters (3/4–1 in) long, and, like other red oaks, take 18 months to mature.

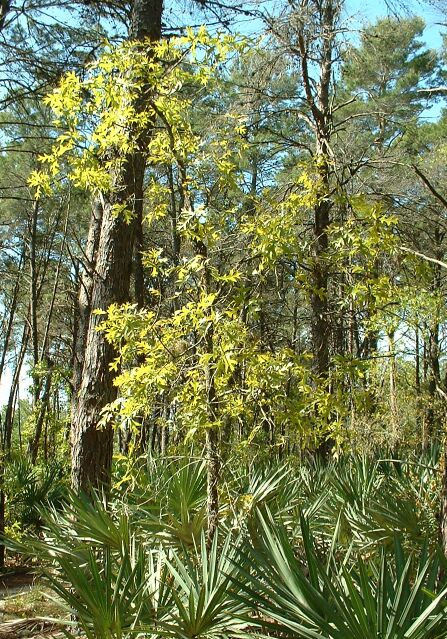
Turkey oak trees

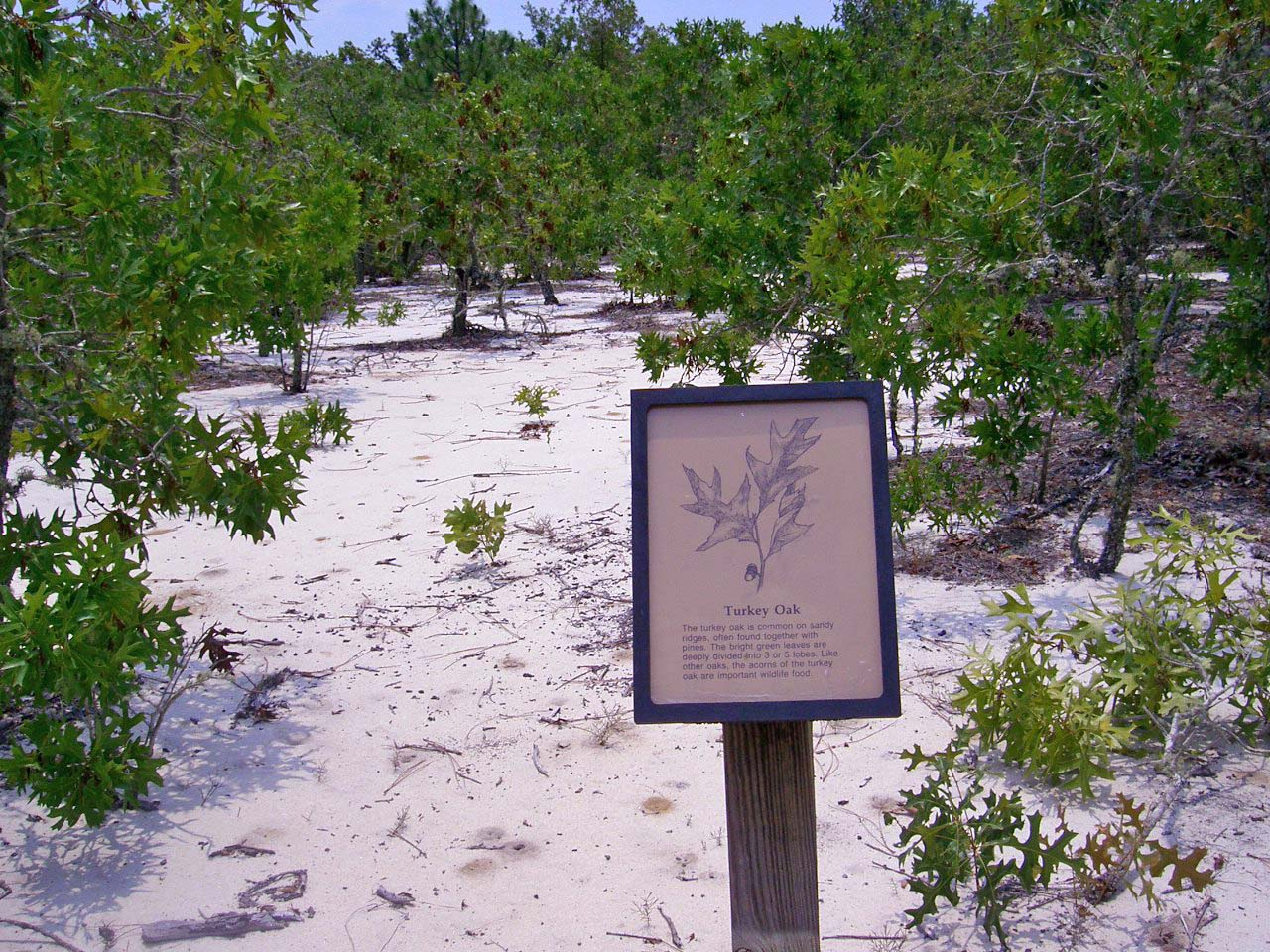
A stand of turkey oaks growing on white sand near the banks of the Ocmulgee River in the state of Georgia

== Distribution and habitat ==
Turkey oak occurs on the coastal plain from Virginia south to southwestern Florida, and west to southeast Louisiana, where it mingles with many tropical trees such as mature coconut palms and large Cuban Laurel (Ficus) trees.

It typically grows on poor, thin, dry, rocky or sandy soils where few other oaks other than blackjack oak (Q. marilandica) can thrive. It does not have the beautiful crown form of many oaks, but is nonetheless a valuable tree for growing on infertile, dry, sandy sites. The deeply lobed leaves are also attractive. It associates as an understory tree with longleaf pine and other pine stands on sandy knolls in the southeastern United States.
