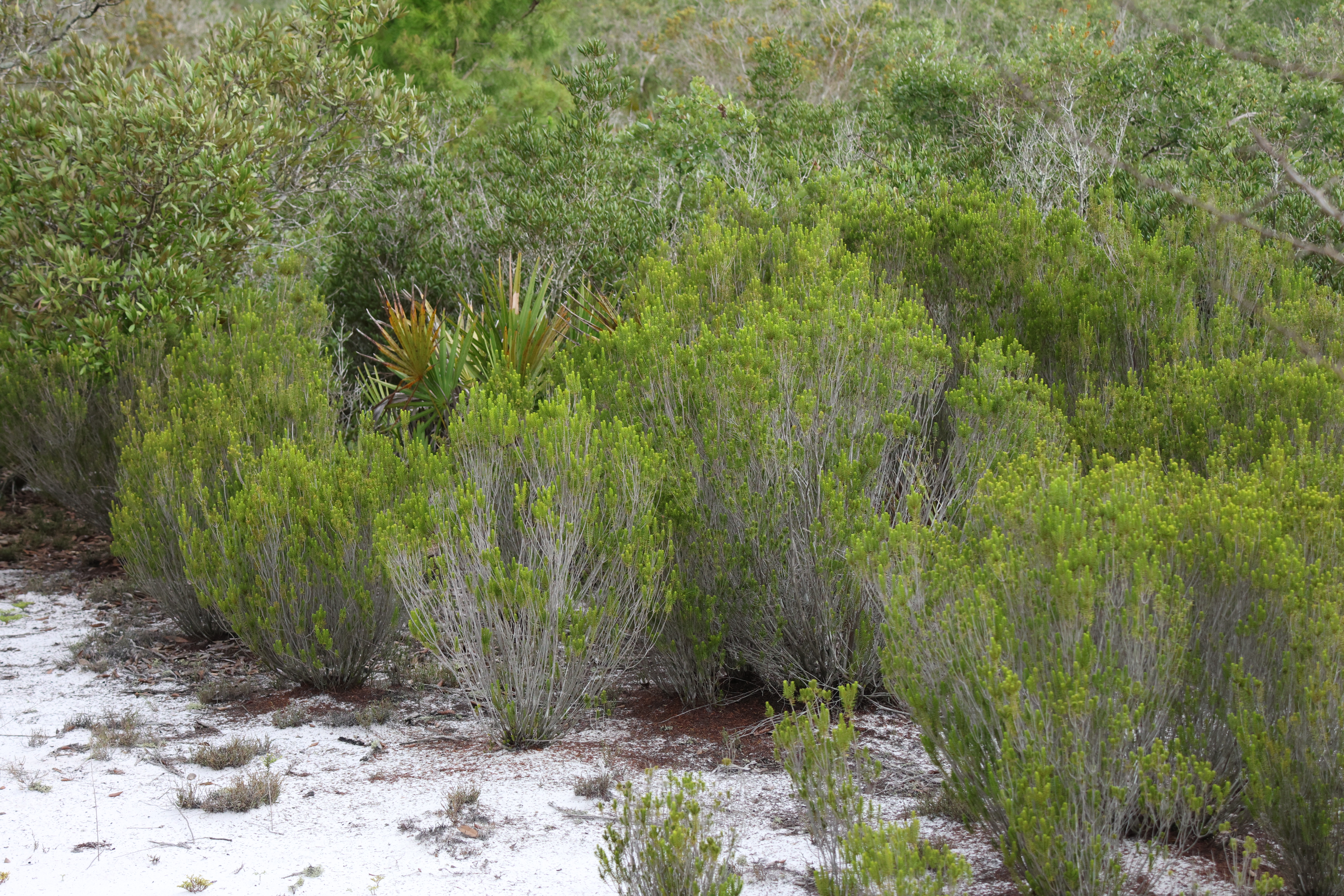
- Growing in scrub on the Lake Wales Ridge

Conservation status
- Apparently Secure (NatureServe)

Scientific classification
- Kingdom: Plantae
- Clade: Tracheophytes
- Clade: Angiosperms
- Clade: Eudicots
- Clade: Asterids
- Order: Ericales
- Family: Ericaceae
- Subfamily: Ericoideae
- Tribe: Empetreae
- Genus: Ceratiola; Michx.
- Species: C. ericoides

Binomial name
- Ceratiola ericoides Michx.

Synonyms
- Ceratiola falcatula Gand.; Empetrum aciculare Bertol.

= Ceratiola =

Genus of flowering plants

Ceratiola is a genus of flowering plants with a single species, Ceratiola ericoides, a shrub endemic to the Southeastern United States.

== Names ==
C. ericoides is commonly known as Florida rosemary, sand heath, scrub rosemary, or sandhill rosemary.

== Description ==
Florida rosemary can grow to 1.8 metres (6 ft) tall. It has a rounded shrub form with dense branching. Its dark green leaves are needle-like, measuring eight to twelve mm long and one mm wide, and smell like the herb rosemary. The small flowers are yellow to brown. The green or yellow fruit is 3 millimetres (1/8 in) in diameter and is a juicy drupe containing two seeds.

=== Reproduction ===
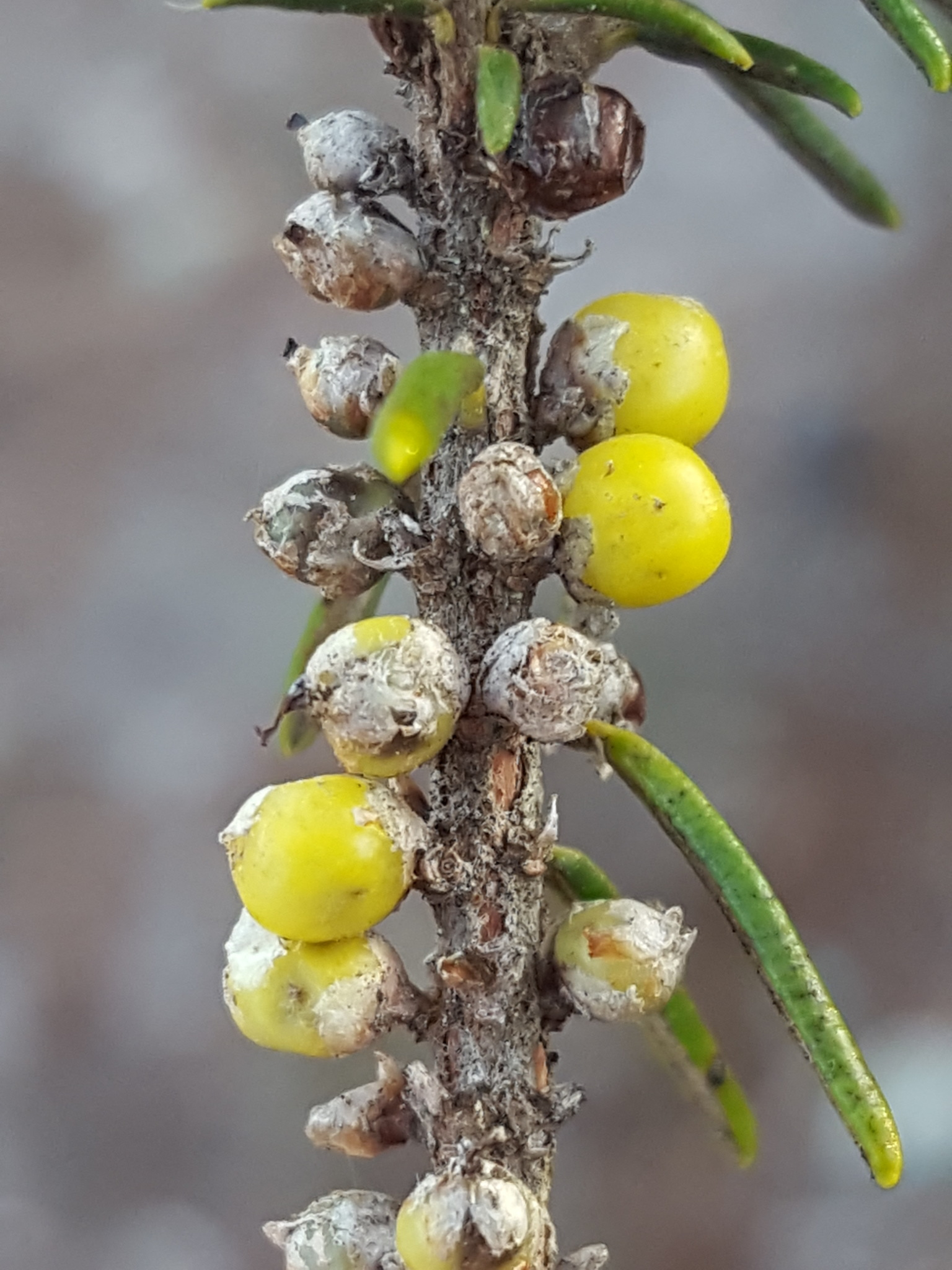
Fruit

The Florida rosemary is dioecious and wind pollinated. Flowers are in the leaf axils on the previous year's growth, blooming from September through October. Fruits ripen in January through April. Flowers and fruit may remain on the plant year-round. Plants do not produce seed until they are 10 to 15 years old. Seed production per plant increases until age 20 to 30 years. Seed production begins to fall off in plants more than 35 years old. (Note: The age of Florida rosemary plants may be estimated by counting branching nodes on main stems, as branching normally occurs once a year. Node count correlates closely to ring count in the base stem. On older plants, older branches may die, or droop down to the ground, establishing roots at the contact point, so that nodes on the new growth are not matched by growth rings in the original stem, making it difficult to determine the age of such plants.)

Florida rosemary plants release a chemical called ceratiolin into the soil, which breaks down into hydrocinnamic acid, which in turn inhibits the growth of other plants, and of rosemary seeds (a process called allelopathy). Decomposition by microbiota, fire, and other disturbances to the soil break down the hydrocinnamic acid, allowing other plants to grow, and rosemary seeds to sprout.

== Taxonomy ==
Ceratiola ericoides is the sole species in the genus Ceratiola. It was formerly included in the plant family Empetraceae, which since 2002 has been reclassified as the tribe Empetreae in the Ericoideae subfamily of the Ericaceae family.

== Distribution and habitat ==
The species is native to subtropical scrub and dry sandy habitats on the Atlantic Coastal Plain in the southeastern United States, including Georgia and South Carolina, throughout Florida, and in coastal counties of Alabama and Mississippi. It commonly occurs in Florida scrubs together with sand pine and evergreen scrub oaks.

== Ecology ==
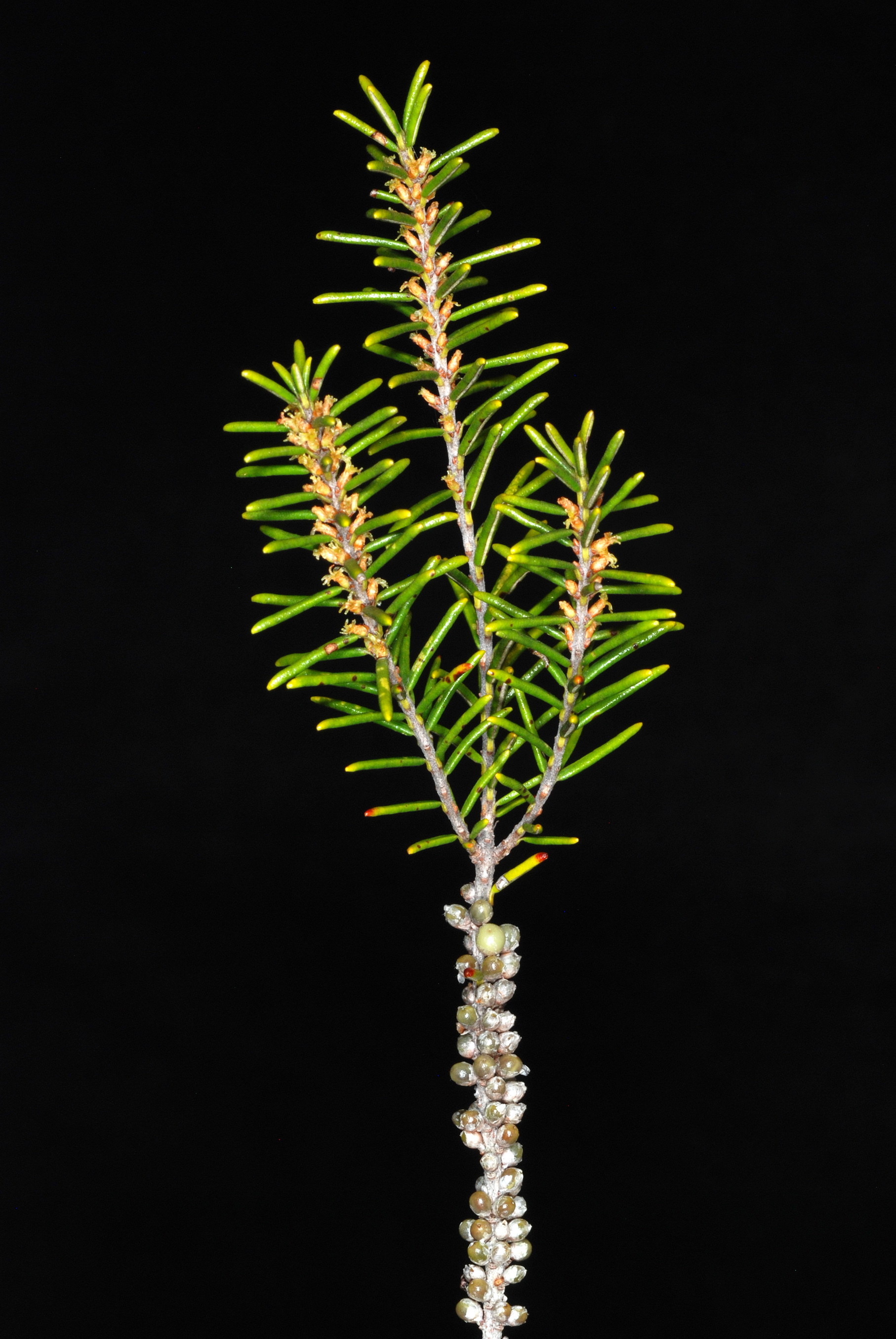
Close-up view

The fruit and seeds are consumed primarily by the Florida harvester ant, the oldfield mouse, the eastern towhee, and the Florida scrub jay. The seeds pass through avian digestive tracts unharmed, but dissolve if eaten by ants and mice. Seeds in soil lose viability in less than 10 years.

Florida scrub communities typically experience fires at 15- to 100-year intervals, which kill all plants, including rosemary. If a scrub patch burns less than ten years after a previous fire, there will not be seeds available in the soil to sprout into new rosemary plants. Johnson suggests that the falloff in seed production after a plant passes 35 years in age indicates that fires usually occur no more than 40 years after a previous fire, so that there is no selective pressure to continue producing large seed crops past 40 years.

== Sources ==
- Gibson, David J.; Menges, Eric S. (June 1994). "Population structure and spatial pattern in the dioecious shrub Ceratiola ericoides". Journal of Vegetation Science. 5 (3): 337–346. Bibcode:1994JVegS...5..337G. doi:10.2307/3235857. JSTOR 3235857.
- Johnson, Ann F. (July 1982). "Some Demographic Characteristics of the Florida Rosemary Ceratiola ericoides Michx". The American Midland Naturalist. 108 (1): 170–174. doi:10.2307/2425306. JSTOR 2425306.
- Kron, K.A.; Judd, W.S.; Stevens, P.F.; Crayn, D.M.; Anderberg, A.A.; Gadek, P.A.; Quinn, C.J. & Luteyn, J.L. (2002). "Phylogenetic Classification of Ericaceae: Molecular and Morphological Evidence". The Botanical Review. 68 (3): 335–423. doi:10.1663/0006-8101(2002)068[0335:pcoema]2.0.co;2. S2CID 35699816.
- Menges, Eric S.; Hawkes, Christine V. (November 1998). "Interactive Effects of Fire and Microhabitat on Plants of Florida Scrub". Ecological Applications. 8 (4): 935–946. doi:10.1890/1051-0761 (inactive 11 July 2025).
- Myers, Roland L. (1990). "Scrub and High Pine". In Myers, Ronald L.; Ewel, John J. (eds.). Ecosystems of Florida. Orlando, Florida: University of Central Florida Press. pp. 150–193. ISBN 0-8130-1022-5.
- Richardson, Donald R.; Hall, Jaclyn (Winter 2004). "The Last Remaining Rosemary Bald in Pinellas County, Florida". Florida Scientist. 67 (1): 9–17. JSTOR 24321895.
- Schmidt, John Paul (6 September 2007). "Sex ratio and spatial patterns of males and females in the dioecious sandhill shrub, Ceratiola ericoides ericoides (Empetreaceae) Michx". Plant Ecology. 196 (2): 281–288. doi:10.1007/s11258-007-9353-2.
