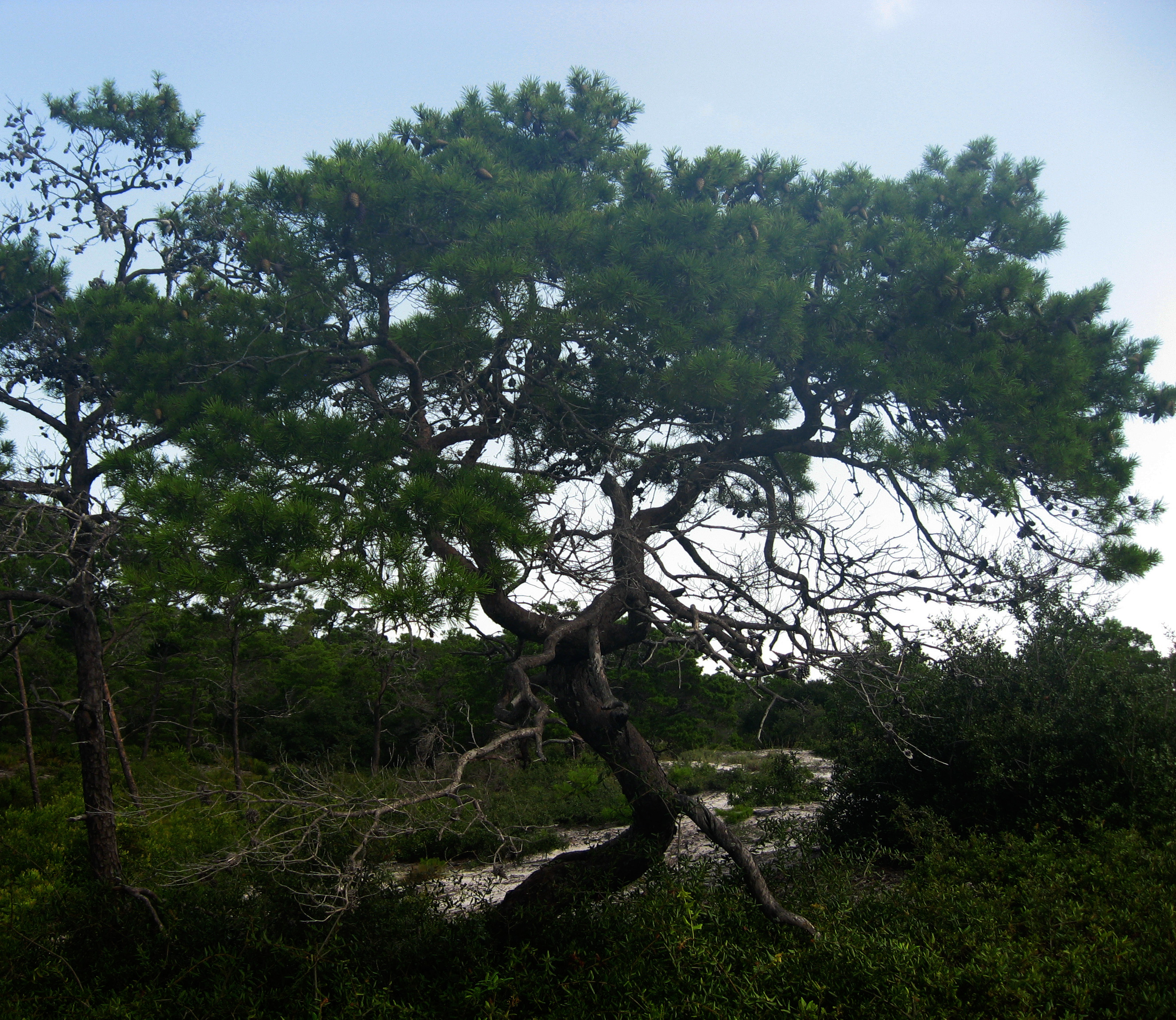

Conservation status
- Least Concern (IUCN 3.1)

- Apparently Secure (NatureServe)

Scientific classification
- Kingdom: Plantae
- Clade: Tracheophytes
- Clade: Gymnosperms
- Division: Pinophyta
- Class: Pinopsida
- Order: Pinales
- Family: Pinaceae
- Genus: Pinus
- Subgenus: P. subg. Pinus
- Section: P. sect. Trifoliae
- Subsection: P. subsect. Contortae
- Species: P. clausa

Binomial name
- Pinus clausa (Chapm. ex Engelm.) Sarg.
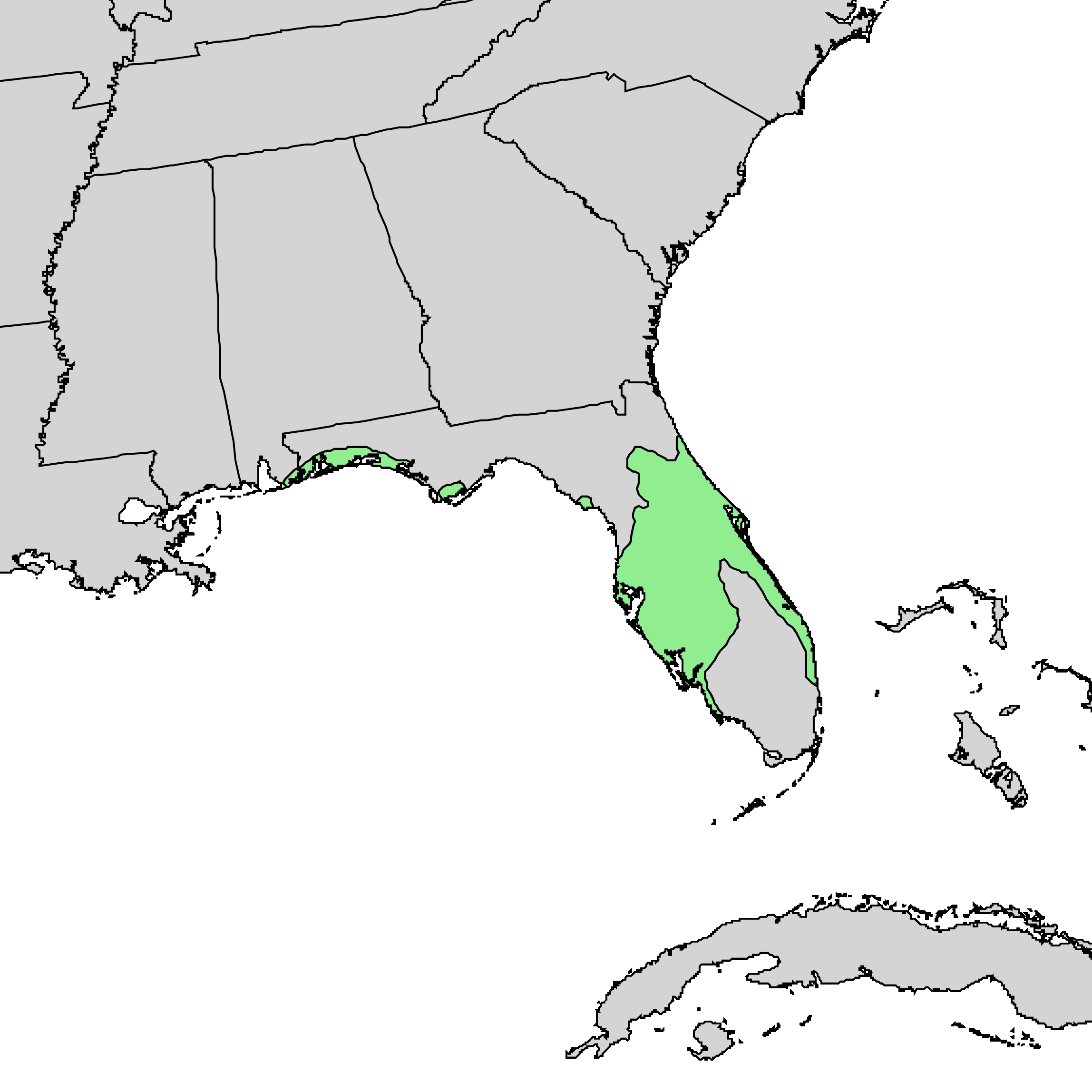
- Generalized natural range of Pinus clausa

= Pinus clausa =

Species of conifer

Pinus clausa, the sand pine, Florida spruce pine, or scrub pine, is a species of conifer in the family Pinaceae, a pine endemic to the Southeastern United States.

== Distribution ==
The tree is found in two separate locations, one across central peninsular Florida, and the other along the western Florida panhandle coast into the Alabama coast. There is a range gap of about 200 km (120 mi) between the populations (from the Ochlockonee River to Cedar Key). The sand pines of the Florida peninsula and of the Florida panhandle coast differ enough to be classified into two varieties or races, Pinus clausa var. clausa ("Ocala"), on the peninsula, and P. clausa var. immuginata ("Choctawhatchee"), along the panhandle coast. While most panhandle sand pines (var. immuginata) have non-serotinous, or open, cones, most of the peninsular sand pines (var. clausa) have serotinous, or closed, cones.

Sand pine is largely confined to the very infertile, excessively well-drained, sandy habitat of Florida scrub. It is often the only canopy tree in the Florida scrub ecosystem. Stands of sand pines in peninsular Florida tend to be dense and of the same age, while stands of sand pines along the panhandle coast tend to be more open than on the peninsula, and with trees of varying age.

== Description ==
Pinus clausa is a small, often shrubby tree from 5–10 m (16–33 ft), exceptionally to 21 m (69 ft) tall. It is vulnerable to windfall, and stands in areas prone to hurricanes can be found leaning in the same direction.

The leaves are needle-like, in pairs, 5–10 cm (2.0–3.9 in) long, and its cones are 3–8 cm (1.2–3.1 in) long.

Over much of its range, it is fire-adapted to stand-replacing wildfires, with the cones remaining closed for many years (clausa = closed), until a natural forest fire kills the mature trees and opens the cones. These then reseed the burnt ground. Some populations differ in having cones that open at maturity, with seed dispersal not relying on fires. Without a fire every 20-60 years, Pinus clausa populations will be succeeded by oak and hickory. Most fires occur in the spring due to low water content in the needles and high winds. In addition, resin content is highest in the spring, causing extreme or uncontrollable fire behavior, such as a 1935 fire in Ocala National Forest that burned 5,670 acres (2,295 ha) in only 4 hours.

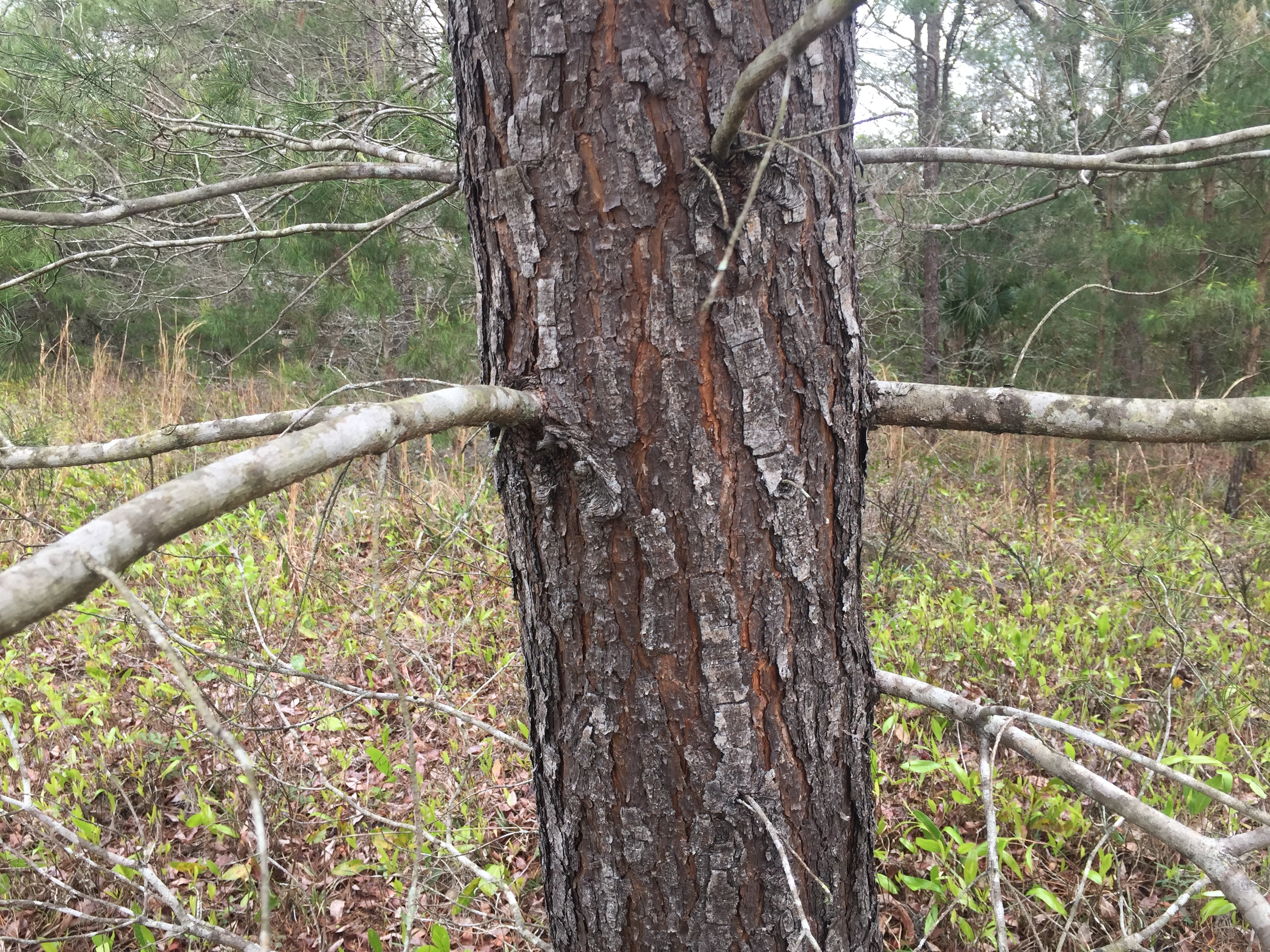
Sand Pine bark

== Uses ==
Pinus clausa woodlands are an important part of the Florida scrub ecosystem, and provide habitat for songbirds, birds of prey, grey and flying squirrels, as well as the endangered Florida sand skink and Florida scrub jay, among other species. It is one of the few canopy trees able to grow in arid, sandy, and hot locations with minimal care.

While the dense branching and crooked trunks makes this tree unsuitable for wood production, it is often used for wood pulp.

== Sources ==
- Brendemuehl, R. H. (1990). "Pinus clausa Sand Pine". In Burns, Russell M.; Honkala, Barbara H. (eds.). Silvics of North America: Volume 1, Conifers. Agriculture Handbook 654. Washington, D.C.: Forest Service, United States Department of Agriculture. pp. 294–301. ISBN 978-0-16-027145-8. LCCN 86-600518.
