= Florida scrub =

Ecoregion of Florida, United States

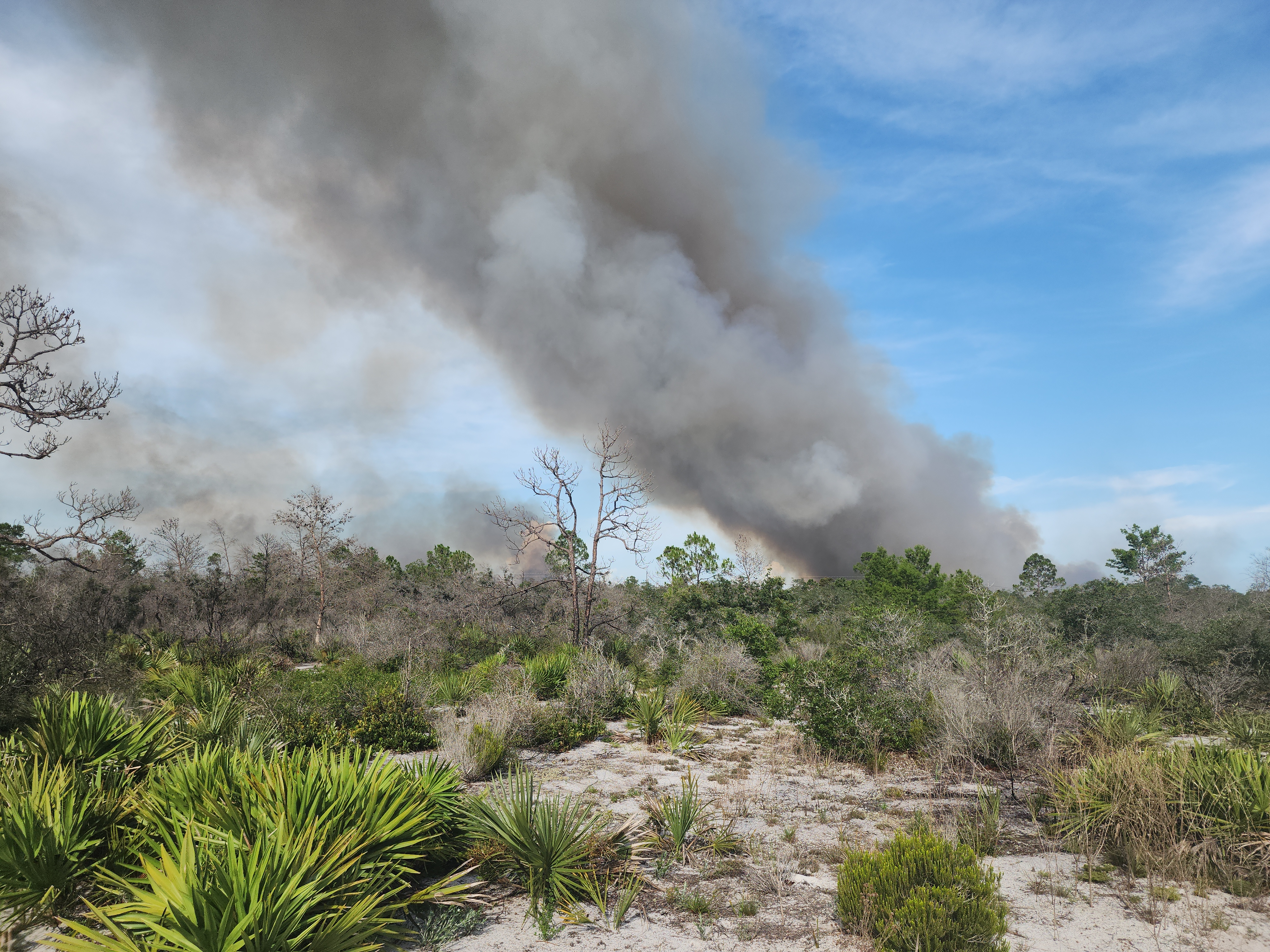
- Mixed rosemary scrub with smoke from prescribed burn on horizon, Archbold Biological Station

Ecology
- Realm: Nearctic
- Biome: Temperate coniferous forest
- Borders: Southeastern conifer forests
- Bird species: 173
- Mammal species: 43

Geography
- Area: 3,900 km^{2} (1,500 mi^{2})
- Country: United States (Florida)
- Climate type: Humid subtropical (Cfa)

Conservation
- Conservation status: Critical/endangered
- Global 200: No
- Habitat loss: Lake Wales Ridge: 85% Peninsula coasts: 90%
- Protected: 34.94%

Florida scrub is a forest ecoregion found throughout Florida in the United States. It is found on coastal and inland sand ridges and is characterized by an evergreen xeromorphic plant community dominated by shrubs and dwarf oaks. Because the low-nutrient sandy soils do not retain moisture, the ecosystem is effectively an arid one. Wildfires infrequently occur in the Florida scrub. Most of the annual rainfall (about 135 cm or 53 in) falls in summer.

The ecosystem is endangered by residential, commercial and agricultural development. The largest remaining block lies in and around the Ocala National Forest. Lake Wales Ridge National Wildlife Refuge also holds a high proportion of remaining scrub habitat, while the Archbold Biological Station near Lake Placid contains about 20 km^{2} (7.7 sq mi) of scrub habitat and sponsors biological research on it.

== Definition ==
Florida scrub is a community of xeromorphic species living on poor, well-drained soil, including some combination of sand pines, evergreen scrub oaks, Florida rosemary, rusty lyonia, and gallberry. Depending on conditions, scrubs may be dominated by saw palmetto, rusty lyonia, and gallberry; by Florida rosemary; by sand pines; or by some combination of evergreen oaks, including sandhill oak, sand live oak, Chapman oak, and myrtle oak. Independently of the number of sand pines present in a scrub, the shrub layer is consistently dominated by myrtle oak, sandhill oak, saw palmetto, sand live oak, Chapman oak, rusty lyonia and Florida rosemary. The scrub palmetto may also be present in scrubs on the Florida peninsula. While the shrub layer is usually dominated by oaks of varying density, some scrubs have a shrub layer consisting almost entirely of rosemary. Herbert John Webber noted that the sand pine is the most noticeable plant in large and moderate sized scrubs, but stated that the scrub oaks are probably more important in maintaining the scrub community.

Florida scrub is usually intimately associated with the longleaf pine sandhill or high pine ecoregion. High pinelands typically consist of longleaf pines, wiregrass, and other grasses, often with clumps or individual trees of deciduous oaks, such as turkey oak, present.

The term "scrub" may also cover plant communities in Florida called "sand pine scrub", "oak scrub", "rosemary scrub", "slash pine scrub", and "coastal scrub". Intermediate between scrub and associated habitats are "scrubby flatwoods" and "scrubby high pine". Some sub-types of Florida scrub are found outside of Florida. Myers notes that the "evergreen scrub forest" and "dune oak scrub" reported in southeastern Georgia cannot be distinguished from the oak and rosemary scrubs of Florida.

=== History ===
The Florida scrub is probably descended from the sclerophyllous Madro-Tertiary Geoflora. (Note: The Madro-Tertiary Geoflora developed in a dry zone between the Arcto-Tertiary Geoflora and the Neotropical-Tertiary Geoflora. It was well-established in the southern Rocky Mountains and northern Mexico by the end of the Oligocene, and spread during the Pliocene and fragmented into derivative floras. The Madrean pine-oak woodlands of Mexico and the southwestern United States are the principal survivors of the Madro-Tertiary Geoflora.) The geoflora spread along the Gulf of Mexico coast, and was widespread in Florida during the late Pleistocene. Near the end of the Pleistocene widespread rosemary scrubs in Florida were replaced by oak savannas, and then by sand pine scrubs. The range of scrubs in Florida contracted over the last 7,000 years as Florida's climate became more moist.

Florida scrub was probably first recognized as a distinct community by Charles Vignoles in 1823, although several naturalists working in the middle of the 19th century still did not do so. Scrub is usually intimately associated with the high pine ecoregion. While the two communities occur on the same poor soil (consisting almost completely of silica sand), they comprise completely different species, and the transition from one community to the other historically (prior to human intervention to suppress wildfire) was abrupt. Marjorie Kinnan Rawlings described the edge of the Big Scrub as "a vast wall, keeping out the timid and the alien."

Webber states that at the end of the 19th century a natural firebreak separated scrubs from high pine land. The grasses and other herbaceous plants of high pine land diminished near the boundary with scrub, and did not quite extend to the brush layer of a scrub. The near absence of plants in the transition zone meant that any grass fire that did reach the zone did not have enough intensity to ignite the evergreen plants of the shrub layer of a scrub. Webber observed that in 1935 the natural firebreaks seemed to be weakening, which he attributed to the encroachment of human civilization on the areas where scrubs are found.

== Fire ==
Fire in Florida scrub is infrequent but intense, characterized as "catastrophic" or "stand-replacing". Any sand pines in a scrub are killed by such fires, while shrubs burn down to the ground. Fire causes sand pine cones to open and release their seeds to replace the stand. Most shrubs regrow from their roots, while rosemary regrows from seed. As previously noted, the Florida scrub and longleaf pine sandhill (high pine) communities are closely associated, growing on the same types of soil and under very similar conditions. Both communities are shaped by periodic fires, and the frequency and intensity of fires may prevent one community from replacing the other. Longleaf pine sandhill communities experience frequent (typically one to ten year intervals), low-intensity fires that primarily burn grass and other understory plants. Those low-intensity fires do not usually invade neighboring scrub communities. When fires have been suppressed in sandhill communities, sand pines and oaks that are typical of scrub begin invading sandhill. Scrub communities typically experience fires at 15 to 100 year intervals. Fires that occur more frequently than 15 years in scrub can prevent regrowth of sand pines and shrubs (oaks, rosemary, etc.), opening the area to invasion by plants of the sandhill community. Scrubby flatwoods usually burn at 5 to 20 year intervals. Long-term suppression of fire in scrubby flatwoods allows them to develop into xeric hammocks.

Unlike in longleaf pine sandhills, the ground litter in scrub has a high heat of combustion, and it is not easy for fire to start or move into scrub. Fires may spread into scrub under extreme conditions, such as high wind, low humidity, and low fuel moisture. As a result of the resistance of scrub to fire, scrubs often serve as barriers to the spread of fire.

Most fires in scrub result from the spread of a fire from an adjacent plant community. Scrubs that border less flammable ecosystems are somewhat protected from the spread of fire. On the Lake Wales Ridge, scrubs often border or are surrounded by swamps, lakes, streams or bayheads. Along the coasts, scrubs are bordered by the Atlantic Ocean or Gulf of Mexico, and often by inlets, rivers, and swamps. The Big Scrub of the Ocala National Forest lies between the St. Johns and Oklawaha rivers.

The frequency of fire in scrub depends, in part, on the productivity of the soil. Sites with very poor soil tend to support rosemary scrubs (sometimes called "rosemary balds"), which rarely burn. The death of older rosemary bushes leaves open spots where new rosemary seedlings or sand pine seedlings may start growing. On sites with more productive soil, scrubs persist only if fires occur frequently enough (every 15 to 100 years). If a scrub burns more often than every 15 years, sand pines cannot reseed and the scrub becomes oak-dominated, or converts to high pine. If a scrub goes much longer than 100 years without burning, it begins to develop into a xeric woodland.

Damage from tropical cyclones may be more important than fire in maintaining the scrubs on the panhandle coast. As most of the sand pines of the panhandle produce open cones, seeds are released every year and not just after a fire, and the pines in a scrub vary in age, unlike the uniform age of the pines in a given peninsular scrub.

== Recovery ==
Webber noted that fire in scrubs burns scrub oaks to the ground and kills other plants, including pines. Recovery of a scrub occurs because the scrub oaks have extensive root systems which survive a fire, and which quickly sprout new growth. He observed that in an area of scrub that had burned two years earlier, almost the entire area was covered by a thick 2 to 3 feet (0.61 to 0.91 m) high growth of scrub oaks. Many seedlings of sand pines (6 to 8 inches (150 to 200 mm) high), and of other plants typical of the scrub community, were growing under the oak canopy. The crowded conditions of the early stage of recovery leads to the death (thinning out) of many individual plants, and after a few years the typical scrub community is established.

Rosemary scrubs regenerate after a fire from seeds that have accumulated in the soil. If rosemary scrubs burn less than ten years after a previous fire, it is unlikely that there will be sufficient rosemary seeds available to repopulate the community, and the scrub may be invaded by oaks.

== Soils ==
The soils in Florida scrub are entisols, recently developed soils without horizons, classified as quartzipsamments. They consist almost entirely of sand, with little to no silt, clay, or organic matter. They are very well-drained, and among the least fertile soils in Florida. The soils range in color from pure white to brown, grey or yellow. The litter on the ground in scrubs produces organic acids which bleach color from sand grains, so that the darkness of soil color to a large degree correlates inversely with the length of time scrub vegetation has been growing on the soil.

== Endemic species ==
About 40 plant species, at least 40 arthropod species, and several vertebrate species are endemic to Florida scrub. As of 1990, 13 endemic plant species were listed by the U.S. as endangered or threatened, and 22 were so listed by the state of Florida.

=== Plants ===
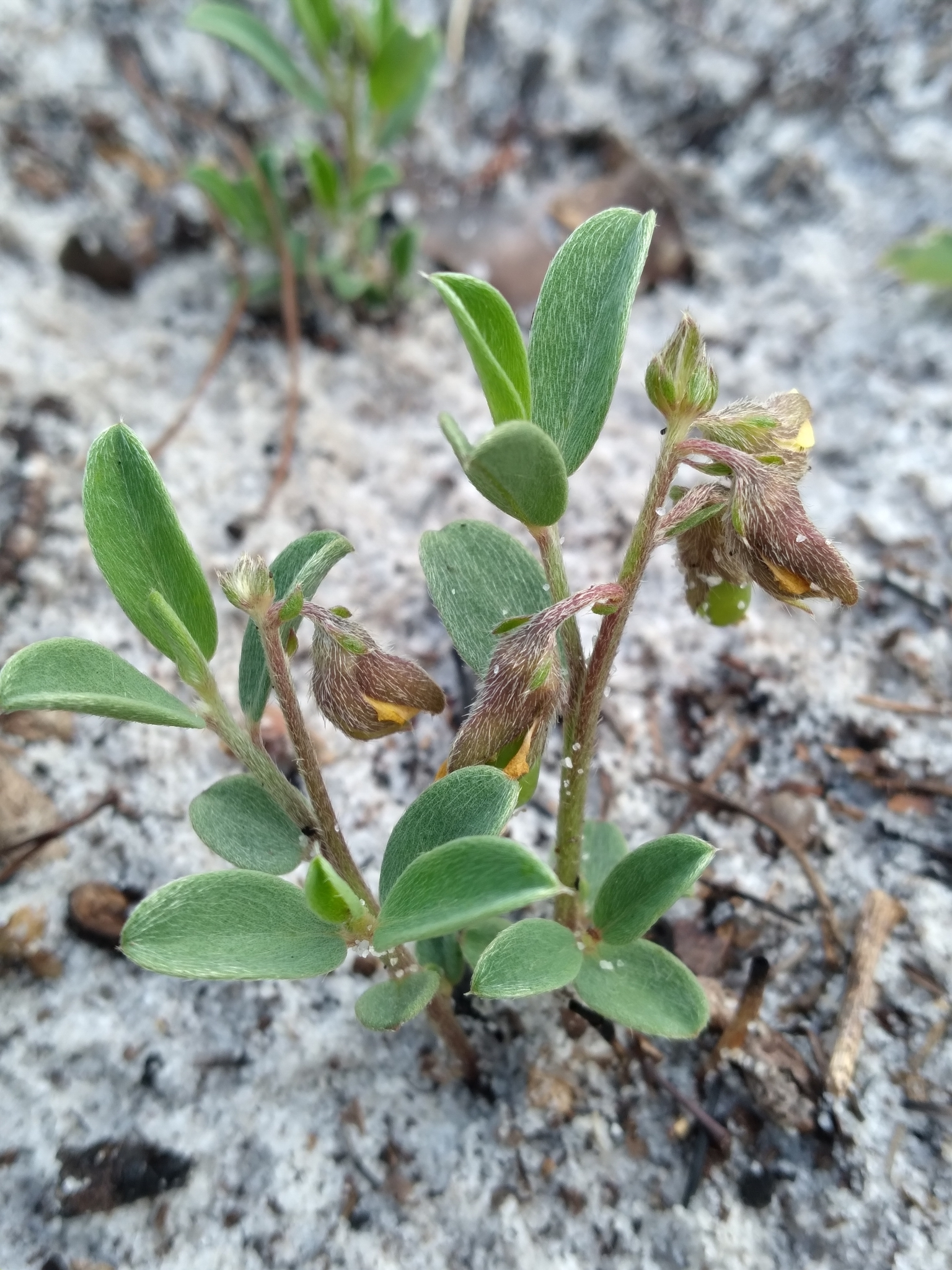
The endangered Avon Park rattlebox, Crotalaria avonensis

Plants that are endemic to scrub and "scrubby" communities in Florida (Note: A few species may also be found in scrub communities just outside of Florida in southernmost Alabama or southeasternmost Georgia.) and that are listed as endangered by the United States Fish and Wildlife Service (USFWS) include: Asimina tetramera (four-petal pawpaw), Chionanthus pygmaeus (pygmy fringetree), Cladonia perforata (Florida perforate cladonia, Florida perforate reindeer lichen), Conradina brevifolia (short-leaved false rosemary), Conradina etonia (Etonia rosemary), Crotalaria avonensis (Avon Park rattlebox, Avon Park harebells, Avon Park rabbit-bells), Dicerandra christmanii (Garrett's mint, yellow scrub balm, Lake Wales balm), Dicerandra cornutissima (longspurred mint, longspurred balm, Robin's mint) Dicerandra frutescens (scrub mint or scrub balm), Dicerandra immaculata (Lakela's mint, Olga's mint, spotless balm), Eryngium cuneifolium (wedgeleaf eryngo, wedge-leaved button-snakeroot, snakeroot), Hypericum cumulicola (Highlands scrub hypericum, Highlands scrub St. John's wort), Liatris ohlingerae (Florida blazing star, Florida gayfeather, scrub blazing star, sandtorch), Lupinus aridorum (scrub lupine), Nolina brittoniana (Britton's beargrass), Senega lewtonii (syn. Polygala lewtonii) (Lewton's polygala, Lewton's milkwort), Polygonum basiramia (syn. Polygonella basiramia) (wireweed, hairy wireweed, purple wireweed, Florida jointweed), Polygonum dentoceras (syn. Polygonella myriophylla) (sandlace, woody wireweed, Small's jointweed), Prunus geniculata (scrub plum), Warea carteri (Carter's pineland cress, Carter's mustard), and Pseudoziziphus celata (syn. Ziziphus celata) (Florida jujube, Florida ziziphus).

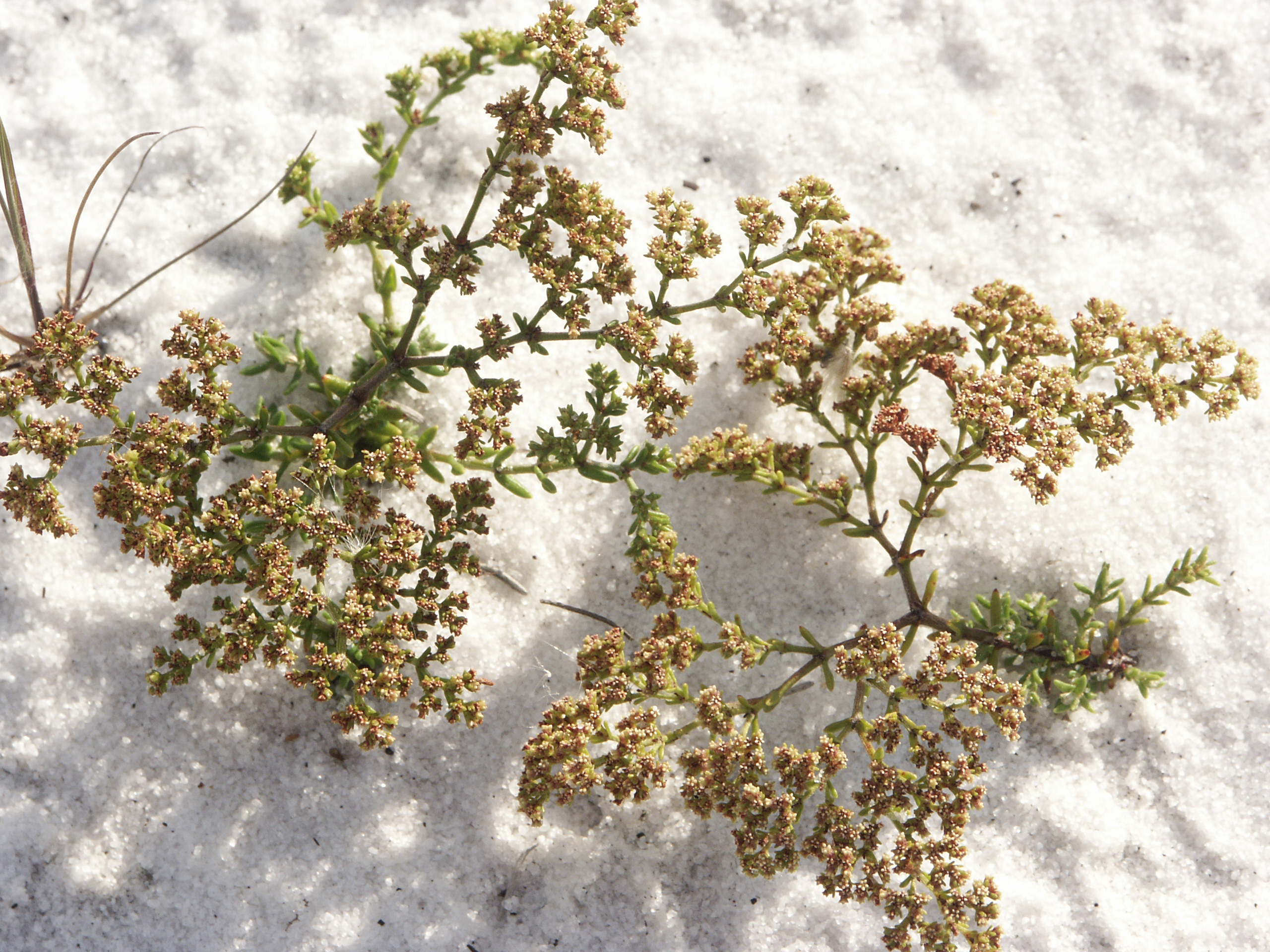
The threatened papery Whitlow-wort, Paronychia chartacea

Plants that are endemic to scrub and "scrubby" communities in Florida and that are listed as threatened by the USFWC include: Bonamia grandiflora (Florida lady's nightcap, Florida bonamia, scrub morning glory), Clitoria fragrans (pigeon wings, sweet-scented pigeon wings), Eriogonum longifolium var. gnaphalifolium (syn. Eriogonum floridanum) (scrub buckwheat), and Paronychia chartacea (papery Whitlow-wort, paper nailwort).

Plants that are endemic to scrub and "scrubby" communities in Florida and that are listed as endangered by the State of Florida (but not by the USFWC) include: Bonamia grandiflora (Florida lady's nightcap, Florida bonamia, scrub morning glory), Asclepias curtissii (Curtiss's milkweed), Chamaesyce cumulicola (coastal dune sandmat, sand dune spurge), Clinopodium ashei (syn. Calamintha ashei) (Ashe's savory, Ashe's calamint), Chrysopsis gossypina cruiseana (Cruise's golden aster), Chrysopsis floridana (Florida golden aster), Chrysopsis godfreyi (Godfrey's golden aster), Chrysopsis highlandsensis (Highlands golden aster), Clitoria fragrans (pigeon wings, sweet-scented pigeon wings), Dicerandra thinicola (Titusville mint), Eriogonum longifolium var. gnaphalifolium (syn. Eriogonum floridanum) (scrub buckwheat), Euphorbia rosescens (scrub spurge), Lechea divaricata (spreading pinweed), Lechea lakelae (Lakela's pinweed), Paronychia chartacea (papery Whitlow-wort, paper nailwort), Rhynchospora megaplumosa (Manatee beaksedge), and Schizachyrium niveum (scrub bluestem).

Plants that are endemic to scrub and "scrubby" communities in Florida and that are listed as threatened by the State of Florida (but not by the USFWS) include: Conradina grandiflora (largeflower false rosemary, large-flowered rosemary), Garberia heterophylla (garberia, Garber's scrub starts), Lechea cernua (nodding pinweed), and Polygonum smallianum (syn. Polygonella macrophylla) (largeleaf jointweed).

Other plants that are endemic to scrub and "scrubby" communities in Florida include: Carya floridana (scrub hickory) Euphorbia c.f. floridana (greater Florida spurge), Garberia heterophylla (garberia, Garber's scrub starts), Crocanthemum nashii (syn. Helianthemum nashii) (Florida scrub frostweed), Persea borbonia humilis (syn. Persea humilis) (silk bay), Pinus clausa (sand pine, Florida spruce pine, scrub pine), Quercus inopina (sandhill oak), Cartrema floridanum (syn.Osmanthus megacarpus) (scrub wild olive), Sabal etonia (scrub palmetto), and Sisyrinchium xerophyllum (jeweled blue-eyed grass, Florida blue-eyed grass).(

=== Vertebrates ===
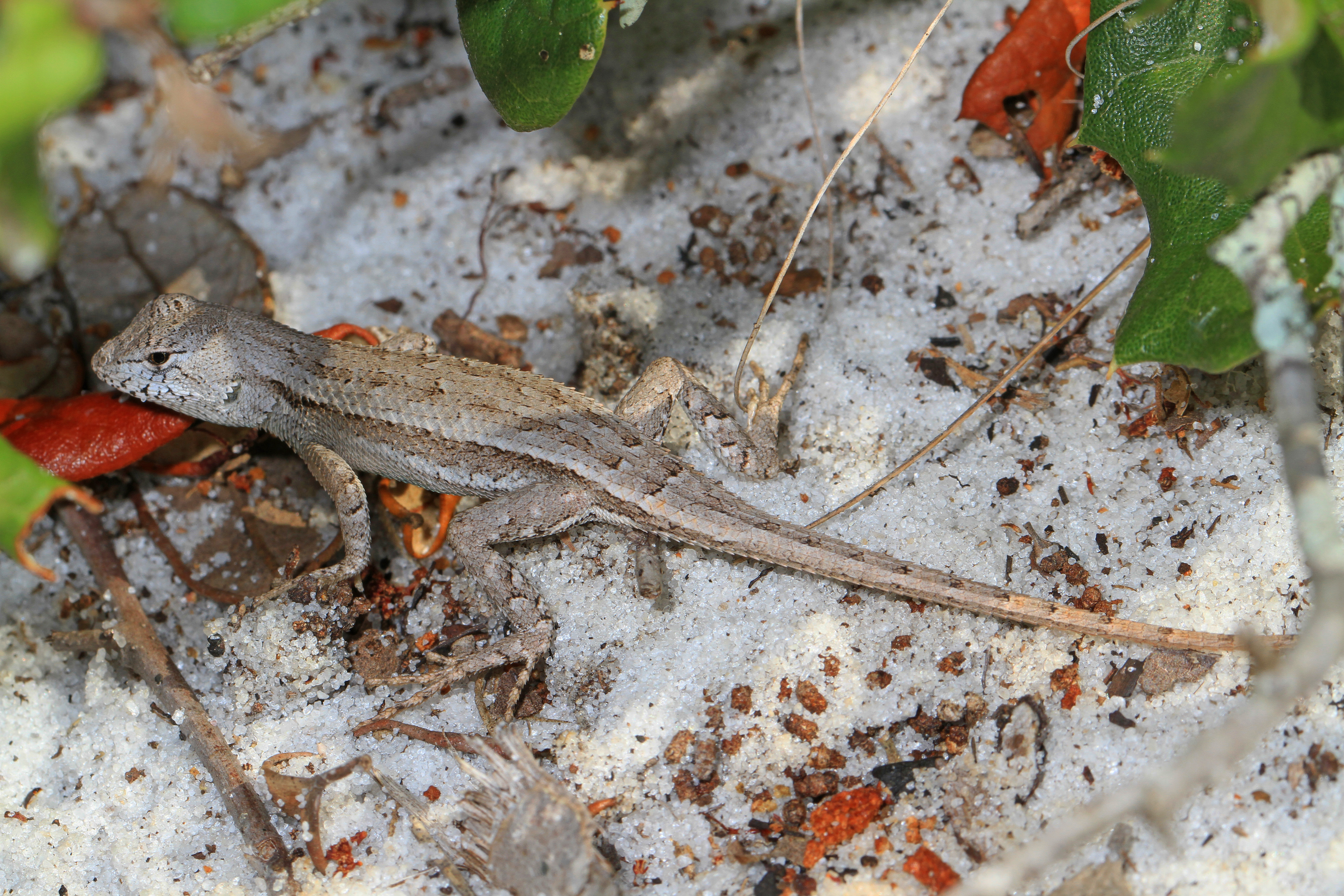
Florida scrub lizard

Vertebrates endemic to Florida scrub and related habitats include the Florida scrub jay (Aphelocoma coerulescens), the Florida mouse (Podomys floridanus), sand skink (Neoseps reynoldsi), Florida scrub lizard (Sceloporus woodi), Florida worm lizard (Rhineura floridana), bluetail mole skink (Plestiodon egregius lividus), peninsula mole skink (Plestiodon egregius onocrepis), short-tailed snake (Lampropeltis extenuata), Florida scarlet snake (Cemophora coccinea coccinea), and Florida crowned snake (Tantilla relicta).

=== Arthropods ===
Arthropods known to be endemic to Florida scrub include:

==== Centipedes and millipedes ====
The Florida scrub millipedes include three species endemic to Florida, Floridobolus floydi, F. orini, and F. penneri. The first of those to have been described, F. penneri, has been found only in scrubs on the Lake Wales Ridge in Polk and Highlands counties. F. orini has been found only in the Big Scrub in Ocala National Forest in Marion County, and F. floydi only in scrubs on the southern part of the Brooksville Ridge in Citrus, Hernando, and Pasco counties.

==== Spiders and other arachnids ====
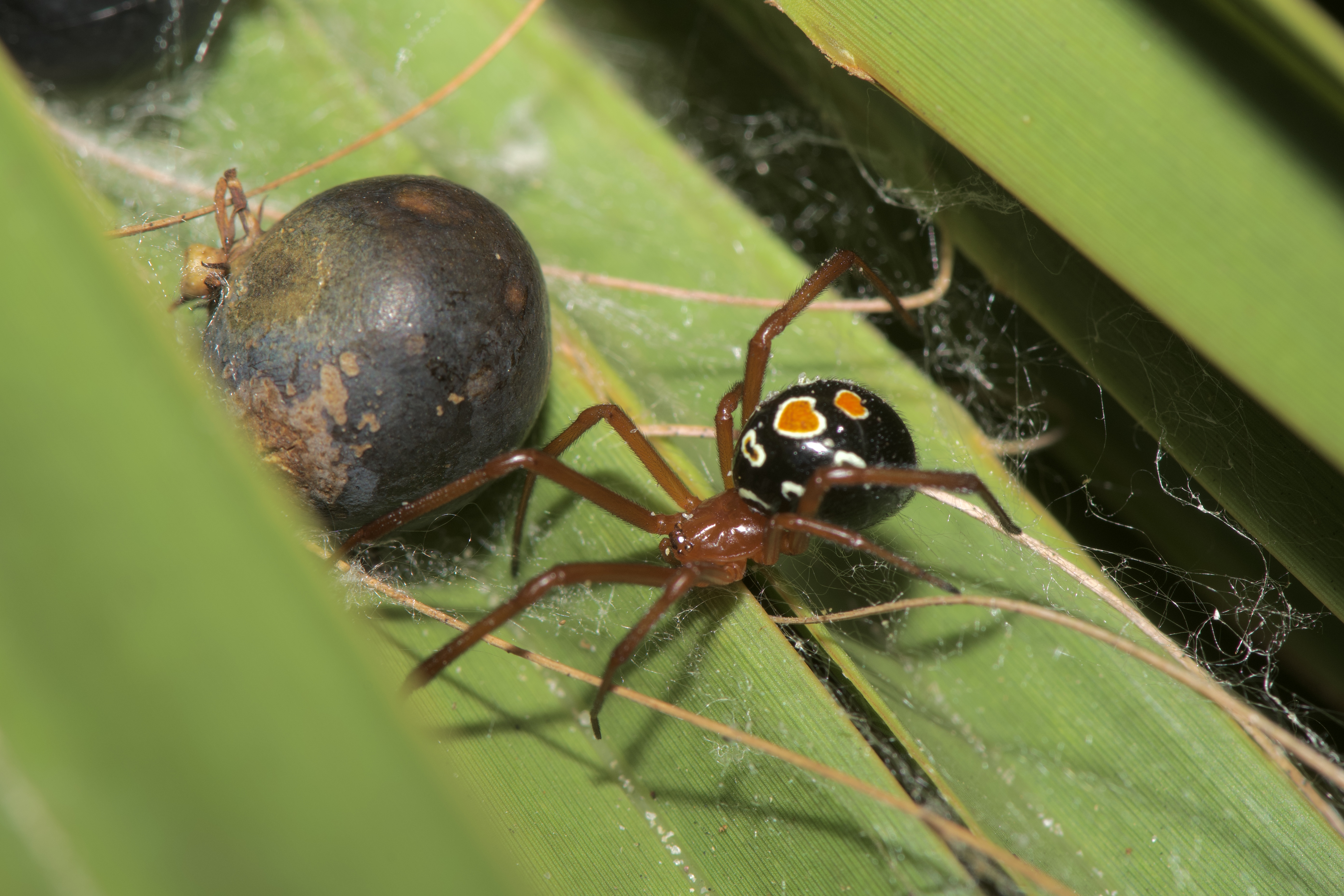
The red widow spider

Several species of the Wolf Spider family Lycosidae are especially notable, include the unusually web-constructing species Sosippus placidus, the Lake Placid funnel wolf spider, which has been found on the southern Lake Wales Ridge in Highlands County. Other Lycosidae with more typical behaviours include Geolycosa xera, McCrone's Burrowing Wolf Spider with two subspecies: G. xera xera on the Marion Uplands in Lake, Orange, Seminole, and Volusia counties and on the Lake Wales Ridge, while G. xera archboldi has been found only on the southern part of the Lake Wales Ridge. Another, Hogna pseudoceratiola (known as Lycosa pseudoceratiola in older scientific literature), are found on the Atlantic Coastal Ridge in Miami-Dade, Palm Beach, Martin, and Indian River counties. Hogna ericeticola, the rosemary wolf spider, has been found in rosemary scrubs on the Marion Uplands in Putnam County. Finally, Schizocosa ceratiola (or as Lycosa ceratiola in older literature) has been found on the Mount Dora Ridge in Lake County, on the Atlantic Coastal Ridge in Martin and Palm Beach counties, and on the Lake Wales Ridge in Highlands County.

Most other families of spiders are not well studied for their distributions, however Zelotes florodes has been found only on the Lake Wales Ridge in Polk and Highlands counties. Zelotes ocala has been found only in scrubs on the Marion Uplands in Alachua, Marion and Putnam counties, and on the southern Lake Wales Ridge in Highlands county. Another notable spider is Latrodectus bishopi, the red widow spider, which has been found in scrubs on the southern Lake Worth Ridge and the Atlantic Coastal Ridge, but appears to have a wider distribution. Its webs are commonly found on the leafs of scrub palmettos.

==== Beetles ====
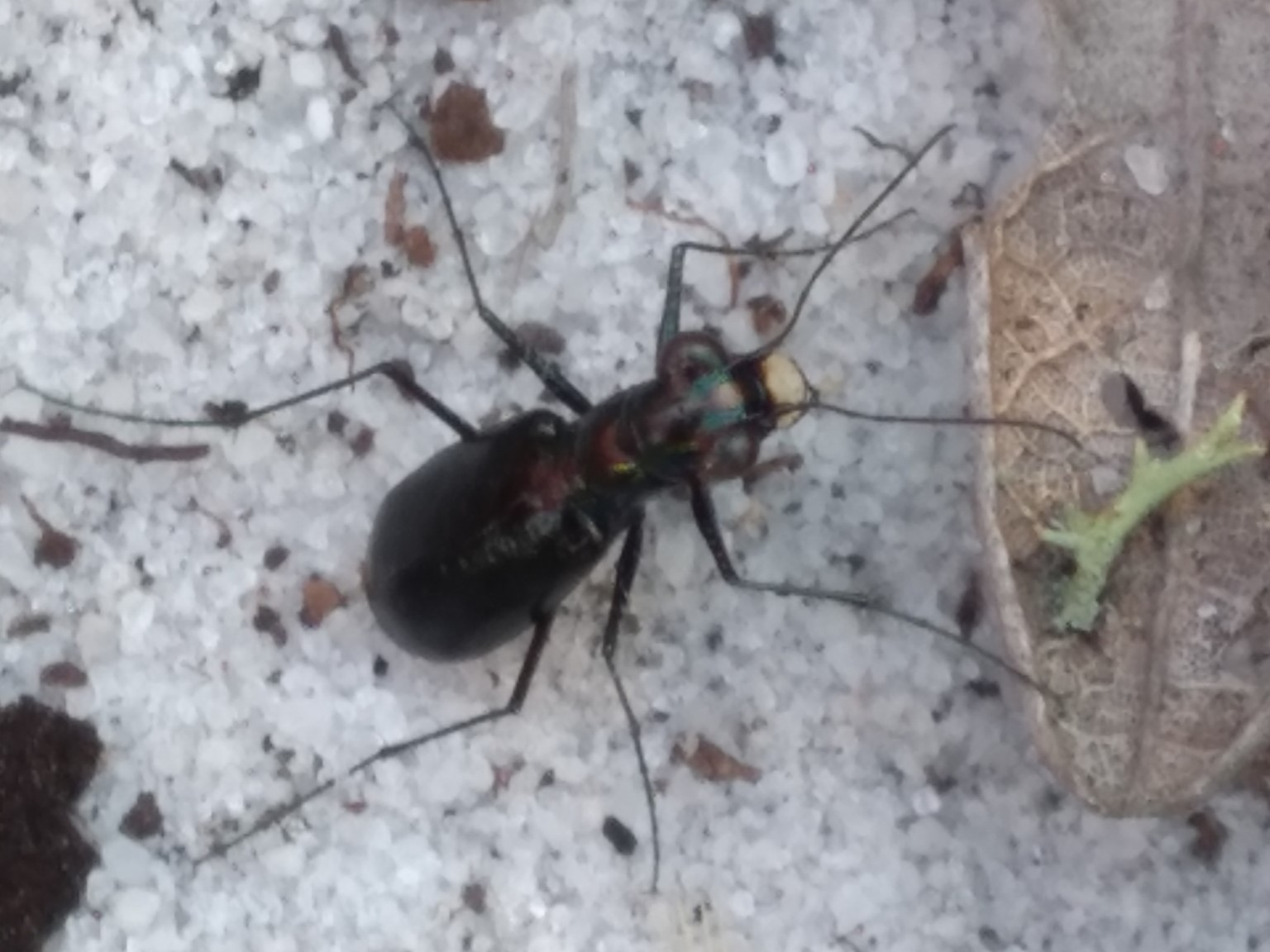
Highlands tiger beetle

Cicindela highlandensis, the Highlands tiger beetle, has been found only on the southern Lake Wales Ridge. Another tiger beetle, C. scabrosa, has been found on the Crescent City Ridge in Putnam County, the Atlantic Coastal Ridge in Broward County, and the Lake Wales Ridge in Highlands County. The scarab beetles Serica frosti and Anomala eximia have been found only at the Archbold Biological Station in Highlands County. The June beetle Phyllophaga elizoria has been found on the Atlantic Coastal Ridge in Indian River County and the Lake Wales Ridge in Highlands County. Other scarab beetles of the Phyllophaga genus include P. elongata, found on the Lake Wales Ridge in Polk and Highlands counties, and in Hillsborough, Lake, Levy, and Marion counties; and P. panorpa and P. okeechobeea, found on the Lake Wales Ridge. The flower chafer Trigonopeltastes floridanus has been found on the Lake Wales Ridge in Highlands County, the Orlando Ridge in Orange County, the Atlantic Coastal Ridge in Indian River County, the Mount Dora Ridge in Marion County, and the Northern Highlands in Alachua County. The earth-boring scarab beetle Mycotrupes pedester has been found in Charlotte, DeSoto, and Lee counties. Peltotrupes youngi, Young's deep digger scarab, has been found on the Mount Dora Ridge in Marion and Putnum counties.

At least two dung beetles are endemic to the Florida scrub: Onthophagus aciculatulus has been found only at the Archbold Biological Station, and Haroldiataenius saramari has been found on the Mount Dora Ridge and Sumter Uplands in Marion County, on the Atlantic Coastal Ridge in Martin and St. Lucie counties, near St. Cloud, and on the Lake Wales Ridge in Highlands County. An undescribed dung beetle of the Psammodius genus has been found at the Archbold Biological Station. Aethecerinus hornii has been found in Lee County and on the Lake Wales Ridge in Highlands County. The firefly Pleotomodes needhami has been found only at the Archbold Biological Station. The firefly Lucidota luteicollis has been found on the Lake Wales Ridge in Highlands and Polk counties, the Mount Dora Ridge in Marion County, and the Brooksville Ridge in Levy County.

==== Hymenoptera ====
The wasp Dasymutilla archboldi has been found on the Lake Wales Ridge in Highlands and Polk counties. Photomorphus archboldi, the nocturnal scrub velvet ant, has been found on the Lake Wales Ridge in Highlands County, and the Sumter Upland and the Mount Dora Ridge in Marion County. The ant Dorymyrmex elegans has been found on the Lake Wales Ridge in Highlands County. The ant Dorymyrmex flavopectus has been found on the Lake Wales Ridge in Highlands County and the Mount Dora Ridge in Lake and Marion counties. The ant Odontomachus clarus has been found on the Lake Wales Ridge in Highlands and Polk counties. O. clarus has also been reported from Mexico and the southwestern U.S. The bee Dialictus placidensis has been found near Lake Placid and near Oneco.

==== Other holometabolan insects ====
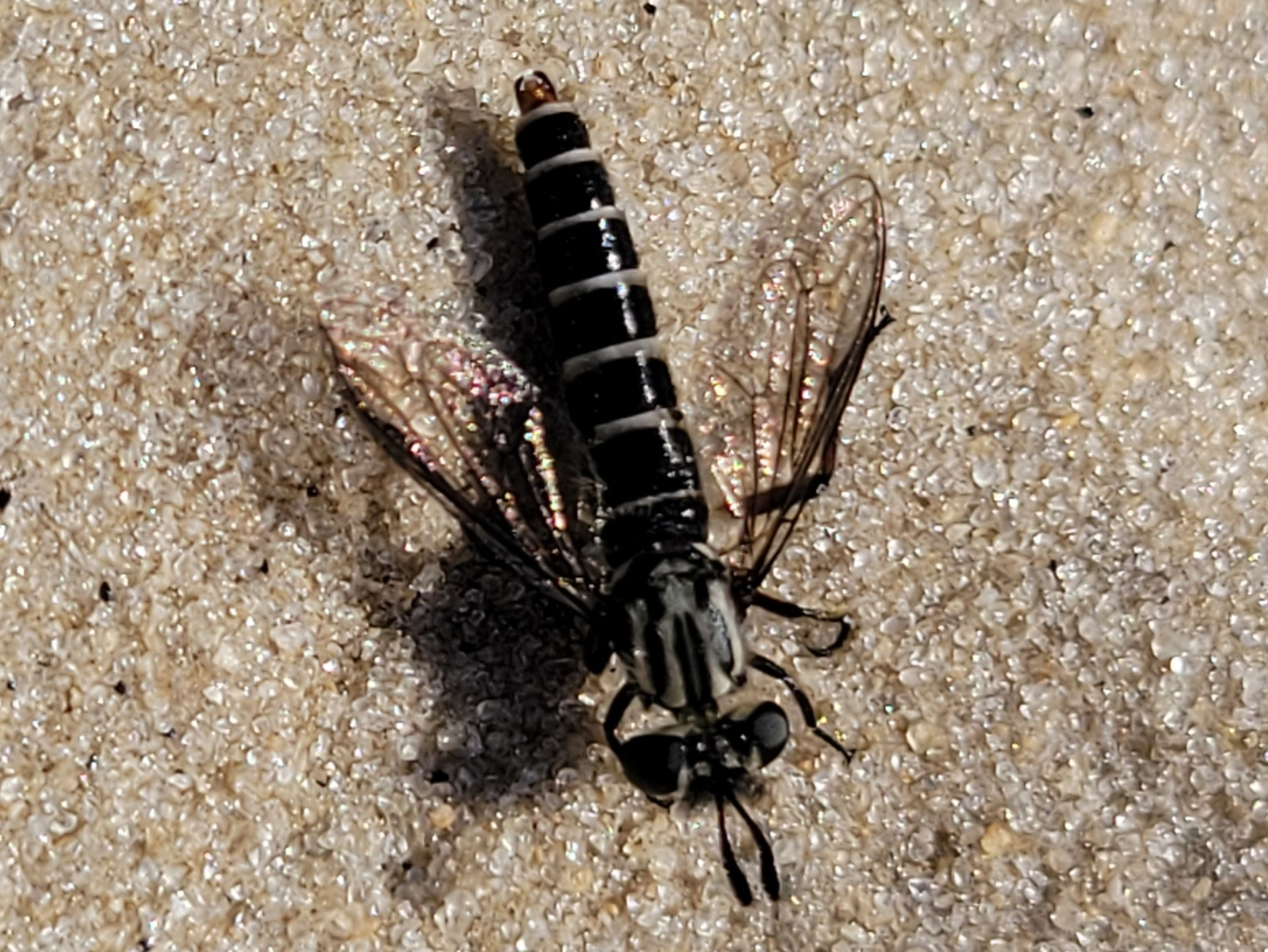
Nemomydas melanopogon

Nemomydas melanopogon, a Mydas fly, has been found on the Mount Dora Ridge in Lake County, the Crescent City Ridge in Putnam County, and the Lake Wales Ridge in Highlands and Pol counties. Another Mydas fly, Nemomydas lara, has been found on the Mount Dora Ridge in Lake and Marion counties and the Orlando Ridge in Orange County. The flea Polygenis floridanus is found only on the Florida mouse, which is endemic to Florida scrub. The geometer moth Nemouria outina has been found on the Lake Wales Ridge in Highlands County, the Brooksville Ridge in Hernando County, and the Orlando Ridge in Orange County.

==== Cockroachs, grasshoppers, and lice ====
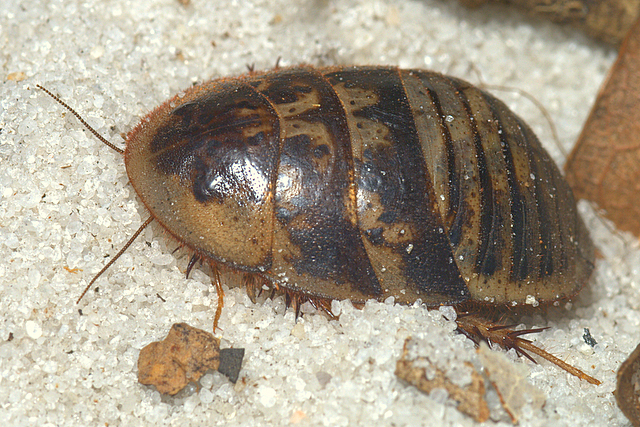
Florida sand cockroach

Arenivaga floridensis, the Florida sand cockroach, has been found in coastal scrub in Pinellas County, on the Lakeland Ridge in Polk County, and the Lake Wales Ridge in Polk and Highlands County. Amongst grasshoppers, Schistocerca ceratiola, the rosemary bird grasshopper, has been found in Florida scrubs on the Orlando Ridge in Orange County, the Mount Dora Ridge in Lake and Orange counties, the Atlantic Coastal Ridge in Martin county, and the southern Lake Wales Ridge in Highlands County. Melanoplus indicifer, the east coast scrub grasshopper, has been found only on the Atlantic Coastal Ridge in Palm Beach County. Melanoplus forcipatus, the broad cercus scrub grasshopper, is primarily found in Florida scrub, but also occurs in pine sandhill communities, on Mount Dora and Orlando ridges in Orange County and the southern Lake Wales Ridge in Highlands County. Melanoplus tequestae, the tequesta scrub grasshopper, has been found on the Orlando Ridge in Orange and Seminole counties, the Mount Dora Ridge in Orange County, and the southern Lake Wales Ridge in Highlands County. Floritettix nigropicta, the dark-painted scrub grasshopper, has been found on the Lakeland Ridge in Polk County, and the Lake Wales Ridge in Polk and Highlands County. Amongst others insects such as lice, the bird louse Brueelia deficiens is only found in Florida on the Florida scrub jay, and so is endemic to the same locations as its host. However, B. deficiens has also been reported on other corvids elsewhere in the western United States and Canada.

== Distribution ==
Florida scrubs are found in three distinct areas in Florida: on a series of ridges running along the center of the peninsula (inland peninsula), along both coasts of the peninsula, and the panhandle coast. Historically, the largest areas of scrub in Florida were in the Big Scrub (also known as the Etonia scrub), which is about 40 miles (64 km) long and 15 to 20 miles (24 to 32 km) wide, in and about the Ocala National Forest, and a mosaic of patches of scrub along the Lake Wales Ridge. High pine habitat occurs as islands in a sea of scrub in the Big Scrub, but in the rest of Florida scrub habitat occurs as islands as small as 50 feet (15 m) in diameter in an expanse of high pinelands.

=== Inland peninsula ===
Florida peninsula inland scrub is the plant community for which this ecoregion is named. Clumps of sand pines (Pinus clausa) constitute the canopy. Common plant species include sand live oak (Quercus geminata), myrtle oak (Q. myrtifolia), sandhill oak (Q. inopina), Chapman oak (Q. chapmanii), Florida rosemary (Ceratiola ericoides), scrub palmetto (Sabal etonia), saw palmetto (Serenoa repens), garberia (Garberia heterophylla), fetterbush lyonia (Lyonia lucida), rusty staggerbush (L. ferruginea), cup lichens (Cladonia spp.), scrub holly (Ilex opaca var. arenicola), American olive (Osmanthus americanus var. megacarpus), flag-pawpaw (Asimina obovata), silk bay (Persea humilis), Adam's needle (Yucca filamentosa), and eastern prickly pear (Opuntia humifusa). As of 1990, about 70% of the scrub on the Lake Wales Ridge had been lost to citrus groves and housing developments.

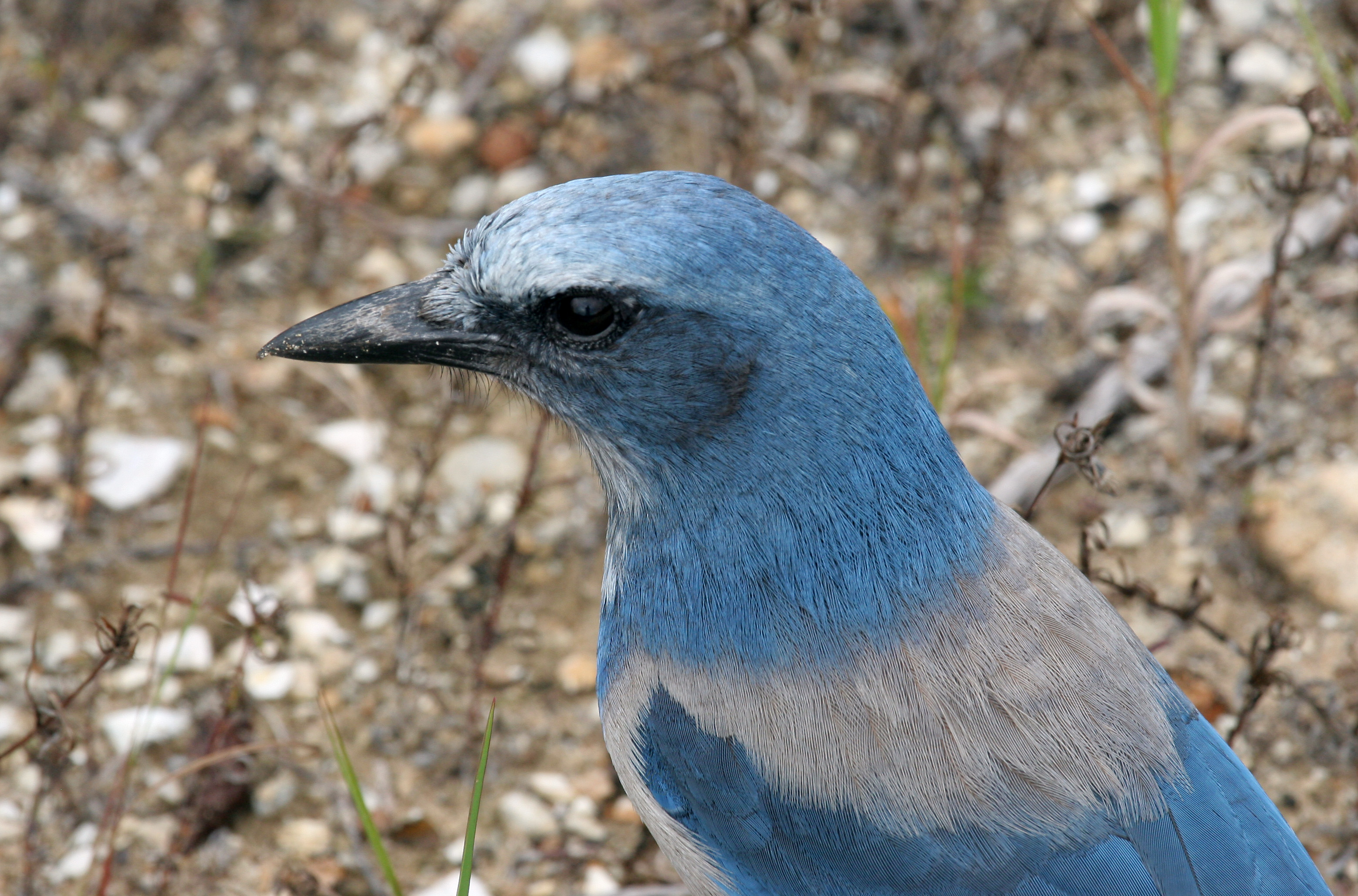
Florida scrub jay

=== Peninsula coasts ===
Scrub communities on the peninsula coasts are found on dune systems associated with the Pamlico and Silver Bluff terraces of the Pleistocene period. (Note: The Pamlico and Silver Bluff features are scarps created along ancient terracess when the sea level was higher than at present. The Pamlico terrace was formed during the glacial recession in the middle of the Wisconsin glaciation, and is about 25 to 35 feet (7.6 to 10.7 m) above the current sea level. The Silver Bluff terrace was formed after the Wisconsin glaciation, and is about 8 to 10 feet (2.4 to 3.0 m) above the current sea level.) Peninsular coastal scrubs are found on the east (Atlantic) coast of Florida as far north as St. Johns County, and were formerly found as far south as northern Broward County, although the southernmost scrubs on the east coast have been lost to urban development. On the west (Gulf) coast, scrubs are found as far north as near the Cedar Keys, (Note: The Cedar Key Scrub State Reserve, located north of Cedar Key, includes an area associated with the Pamlico terrace. Sand pine scrubs are located on the crests of ancient dunes, with scrubby flatwoods on adjacent lower areas.) and were formerly found as far south as Marco Island, but the scrubs on that island have also been lost to urban development. Extensive loss of scrub habitat has occurred throughout Florida. By one estimate, almost 70% of the scrub habitat in northern Brevard County was lost between 1943 and 1991.

Mulvania observes that the scrubs on the coasts, and particularly those on the east coast, appear to be more recent in origin than scrubs of the interior. The soils on which coastal scrubs are found appear to be recently formed, containing a large proportion of shells, while shells have disappeared from the older soils on which interior scrubs grow. Mulvania also notes that the vegetation of coastal scrubs is less uniform than that of interior scrubs.

=== Panhandle coast ===
Scrub communities on the panhandle coast are also found on Pamlico and Silver Bluff dune systems, as well as on recent dune systems along the barrier islands of the panhandle from the Ochlockonee River to Gulf State Park in southern Alabama. The easternmost scrubs of the panhandle coast, just west of the Ochlockonee River, are 200 km from the westernmost scrubs of the peninsula, near Cedar Key. The sand pines of the Florida peninsula and of the panhandle coast differ enough to be classified into two varieties or races, Pinus clausa var. clausa (Ocala), on the peninsula, and Pinus clausa var. immuginata (Choctawhatchee), along the panhandle coast. While most panhandle sand pines (var. immuginata) have non-serotinious, or open, cones, most of the peninsular sand pines (var. clausa) have serotinous, or closed, cones. The scrub palmetto, which may be present in scrubs on the Florida peninsula, does not occur in panhandle coastal scrubs.

== Type by dominant flora ==
Various authors classify Florida scrub into several phases or types, including coastal scrub, oak scrub, oak-hickory scrub, oak-palmetto scrub, rosemary scrub or bald, sand pine scrub, and scrubby flatwoods.

=== Coastal scrub ===
Coastal scrub is a habitat on barrier islands where oaks, in particular, a coastal form of southern live oak, are dominant, and including saw palmetto, wax myrtle, tough buckthorn, rapanea, and Florida privet.

=== Oak scrub ===
Oak scrub is a habitat dominated by a shrub layer of evergreen scrub oaks, but without a tree canopy. It may also include saw palmetto, rosemary, shrub hickory, and rusty lyonia shrubs.

=== Oak-hickory scrub ===
Oak-hickory scrubs are dominated by oaks and scrub hickories, with a scattering of sand pines and slash pines.

=== Oak-saw palmetto scrub ===
Scrubs without a pine tree canopy may fall on a gradient, with such scrubs on drier soil dominated by oaks, and on wetter soils dominated by saw palmetto. Oak-saw palmetto scrubs are intermediate on that gradient. They are dominated by scrub oaks, saw palmetto, and several plants in the Ericaceae family, including rusty staggerbush, poor grub, fetterbush lyonia, and tarflower.

=== Rosemary scrub or bald ===
Rosemary scrubs or balds occur in the driest, and least often burned, portions of scrubs, and are often found on the crest of a hill surrounded by other phases of Florida scrub or other xeric upland habitats. They usually have fewer species present than do scrubs dominated by sand pines or oaks. The exclusion of fire from scrub areas has allowed other species to encroach on rosemary balds so that they have become oak scrubs and, eventually, xeric oak hammocks. The dominant species in rosemary scrubs are Florida rosemary and sand pine.

=== Sand pine scrub ===
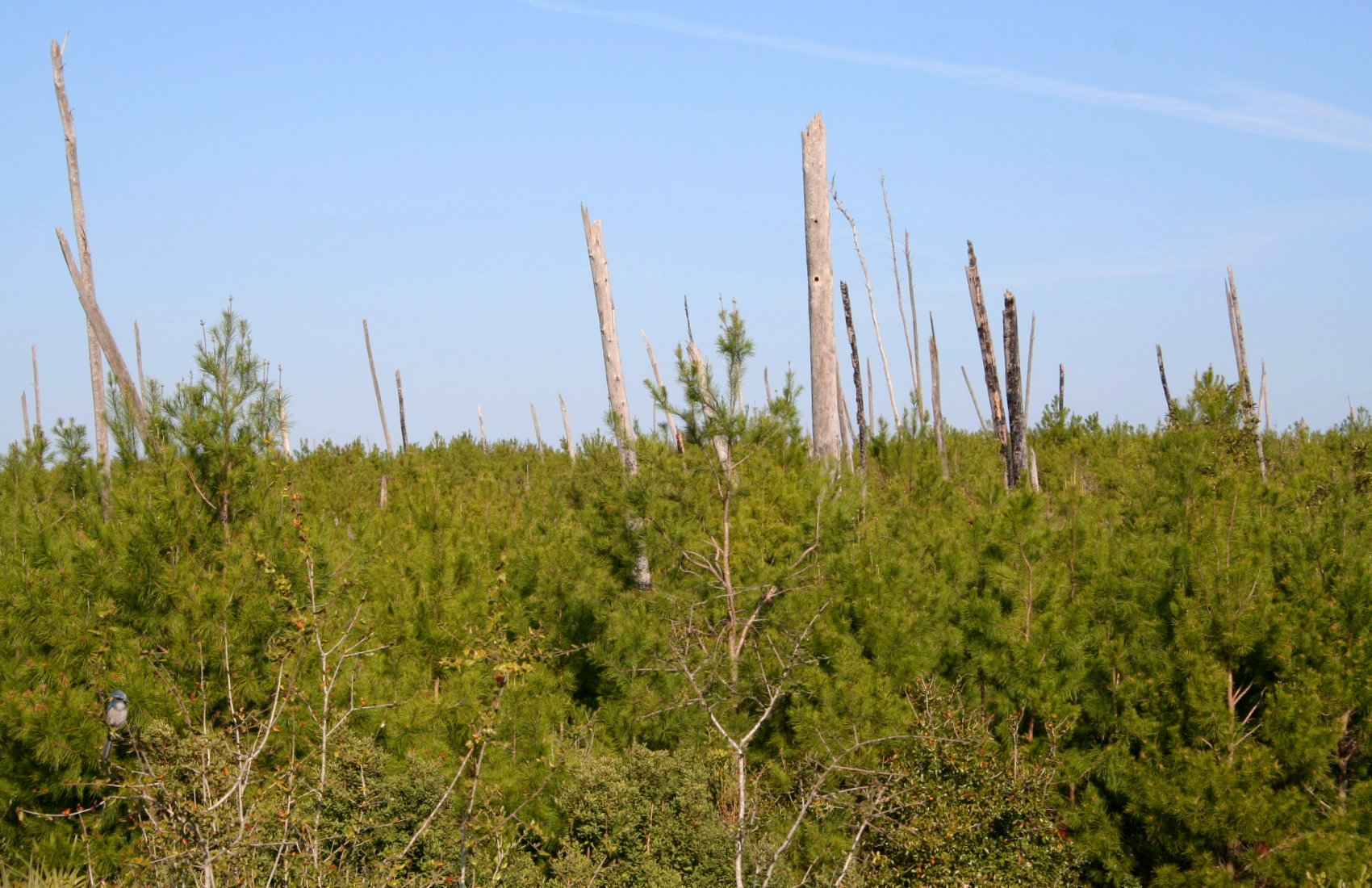
Sand pine scrub in Juniper Prairie Wilderness, Ocala National Forest

Scrubs with a scattered to dense canopy of sand pines are known as "sand pine scrubs". Sand pine scrubs have a shrub layer consisting either of evergreen oaks, saw palmetto, rusty lyonia, and other species, often including rosemary, or one dominated by rosemary. The World Wildlife Federation formerly classified "sand pine scrub" as a temperate coniferous forest ecoregion.

=== Scrubby flatwoods ===
Scrubby flatwoods has been defined as scrubs without a sand pine canopy that are dominated by saw palmettos, evergreen oaks, rusty lyonia, or Florida rosemary. Scrubby flatwoods are an ecotone, intermediate between sand pine scrubs and flatwoods, sitting higher and with better drainage than flatwoods, but lower and with poorer drainage than sand pine scrubs. The Scrubby flatwoods have more scrub oaks in the shrub layer, and less coverage in the herb layer than flatwoods have. Scrubby flatwoods occur widely in Florida, but are more common in the southern part of the peninsula, where they are subject to a subtropical climate. Associations resembling scrubby flatwoods occur along the Gulf coast into Alabama and Mississippi, and into Georgia and South Carolina on the Atlantic coast.

Trees in scrubby flatwoods may include South Florida slash pine, sand pine, and longleaf pine. The shrub layer includes scrub oaks, and saw palmetto. The scrub palmetto is also a common component of scrubby flatwoods in central Florida. Ground cover includes wiregrass and forbs, lichens, and spike moss. Scrubby flatwoods from which fire is excluded are eventually invaded by sand pine and associated scrub shrubs.

=== Scrubby high pine ===
Scrubby high pine habitats have both scrub-adapted species, which do not tolerate frequent fires, and high pine adapted species that depend on frequent fires. Fires in such communities occur at variable intervals, and both types of species can persist, but the communities are unstable. A higher frequency of fires can turn such communities into high pine habitats, while a lower frequency of fires can turn them into xeric hammocks.

== See also ==
- List of ecoregions in the United States (WWF)

== Sources ==
- Abrahamson, Warren G.; Hartnett, David C. (1990). "Pine Flatwoods and Dry Prairies". In Myers, Ronald L.; Ewel, John J. (eds.). Ecosystems of Florida. Orlando, Florida: University of Central Florida Press. pp. 103–149. ISBN 0-8130-1022-5.
- Amoroso, Jame L.; Judd, Walter S. (September 1995). "A Floristic Study of the Cedar Key Scrub State Preserve, Levy County, Florida". Castanea. 60 (3): 210–232. JSTOR 4033773.
- Breininger, D. R.; Schmalzer, P. A. (January 1990). "Effects of Fire and Disturbance on Plants and Birds in a Florida Oak/Palmetto Scrub Community". American Midland Naturalist. 123 (1): 64–74. doi:10.2307/2425760. JSTOR 2425760.
- Christman, Steven P.; Judd, Walter S. (Winter 1990). "Notes on Plants Endemic to Florida Scrub". Florida Scientist. 53 (1): 52–73. JSTOR 24320380.
- Deyrup, Mark (Autumn 1989). "Arthropods Endemic to Florida Scrub". Florida Scientist. 52 (4): 254–270. JSTOR 24320532.
- Gibson, David J.; Menges, Eric S. (June 1994). "Population structure and spatial pattern in the dioecious shrub Ceratiola ericoides". Journal of Vegetation Science. 5 (3): 337–346. Bibcode:1994JVegS...5..337G. doi:10.2307/3235857. JSTOR 3235857.
- McCoy, Earl D.; Britt, Eric J.; Cattanezzi, Alessandro; Mushinsky, Henry R. (1 July 2013). "Fire and Herpetofaunal Diversity in the Florida Scrub Ecosystem". Natural Areas Journal. 33 (3): 316–326. doi:10.3375/043.033.0310.
- Menges, Eric S.; Hawkes, Christine V. (November 1998). "Interactive Effects of Fire and Microhabitat on Plants of Florida Scrub". Ecological Applications. 8 (4): 935–946. doi:10.1890/1051-0761(1998)008[0935:IEOFAM]2.0.CO;2.
- Mulvania, Maurice (July 1931). "Ecological Survey of a Florida Scrub". Ecology. 12 (3): 528–540. Bibcode:1931Ecol...12..528M. doi:10.2307/1928998. JSTOR 1928998.
- Myers, Roland L. (1990). "Scrub and High Pine". In Myers, Ronald L.; Ewel, John J. (eds.). Ecosystems of Florida. Orlando, Florida: University of Central Florida Press. pp. 150–193. ISBN 0-8130-1022-5.
- Richardson, Donald R.; Hall, Jaclyn (Winter 2004). "The Last Remaining Rosemary Bald in Pinellas County, Florida". Florida Scientist. 67 (1): 9–17. JSTOR 24321895.
- Schmalzer, Paul A.; Boyle, Shannon R.; Swain, Hilary M. (Winter 1999). "Scrub Ecosystems of Brevard County, Florida: A Regional Characterization". Florida Scientist. 62 (1): 13–47. JSTOR 24320960.
- Turcotte, Florence M. (Spring 2012). "For this is an Enchanted Land: Marjorie Kinnan Rawlings and the Florida Environment". The Florida Historical Quarterly. 90 (4): 488–504. JSTOR 23264717.
- Webber, H. J. (March 1935). "The Florida Scrub, a Fire-Fighting Association". American Journal of Botany. 22 (3): 344–361. doi:10.2307/2436361. JSTOR 2436361.
- Core Technical and Planning Team (March 2005). Florida Peninsula Ecoregional Plan (PDF) (Report). Tallahassee and Gainesville, Florida: The Nature Conservancy & The University of Florida Geoplan Center.
- "Florida Scrub" (PDF). South Florida Multi-Species Recovery Plan (Report). Atlanta, Georgia: U.S. Fish and Wildlife Service. May 18, 1999.
- "Endangered, Threatened and Commercially Exploited Plants of Florida". Florida Department of Agriculture and Consumer Services. 2024.
