= Florida peninsula inland scrub =

Ecological zone of Florida, US

The Florida peninsula inland scrub is a shrubland community found on the Florida peninsula. The largest remaining blocks of inland scrub are in and around the Ocala National Forest and in the Lake Wales Ridge National Wildlife Refuge. The Archbold Biological Station near Lake Placid contains about 20 km^{2} (7.7 sq mi) of scrub habitat and sponsors biological research on it. The scrub occurs on a series of north-south running ridges composed of sand derived from ancient dune fields. The soil, a type of entisol, is derived from quartz and is low in organic matter, silt, and clay. Because the low-nutrient sandy soils do not retain moisture, the ecosystem is effectively an arid one.

The plants generally consist of xerophytic shrubs, especially oaks, with occasional pine trees. The understory is often sparse and sometimes absent, leaving only bare ground. Sand pine (Pinus clausa) is the typical pine. Oaks include Chapman oak (Quercus chapmanii), sand live oak (Quercus geminata), myrtle oak (Quercus myrtifolia), and the endemic Inopina oak (Quercus inopina). Other shrubs include rusty staggerbush (Lyonia ferruginea), saw palmetto (Serenoa repens), sandhill-rosemary (Ceratiola ericoides), scrub holly (Ilex opaca var. arenicola), scrub olive (Osmanthus megacarpa), scrub pawpaw (Asimina obovata), silk bay (Persea humilis), Adam's needle (Yucca filamentosa), and eastern prickly pear (Opuntia humifusa).

Endangered plants of the Florida scrub include Florida golden aster (Chrysopsis floridana), Ashe's savory (Calamintha ashei), pygmy fringetree (Chionanthus pygmaeus), sandlace (Polygonum dentoceras), scrub plum (Prunus geniculata), short-leaved false rosemary (Conradina brevifolia), etonia rosemary (Conradina etonia), yellow scrub balm (Dicerandra christmanii), scrub beargrass (Nolina brittoniana), scrub blazingstar (Liatris ohlingerae), scrub lupine (Lupinus aridorum), and scrub morning glory (Bonamia grandiflora).

Notable animals of the Florida scrub include the Florida scrub jay (Aphelocoma coerulescens), Florida mouse (Podomys floridanus), sand skink (Neoseps reynoldsi), bluetail mole skink (Eumeces egregius lividus), Florida scrub lizard (Sceloporus woodi), and Florida worm lizard (Rhineura floridana).

This community is often adjacent to Florida longleaf pine sandhills, which have a markedly different appearance.
