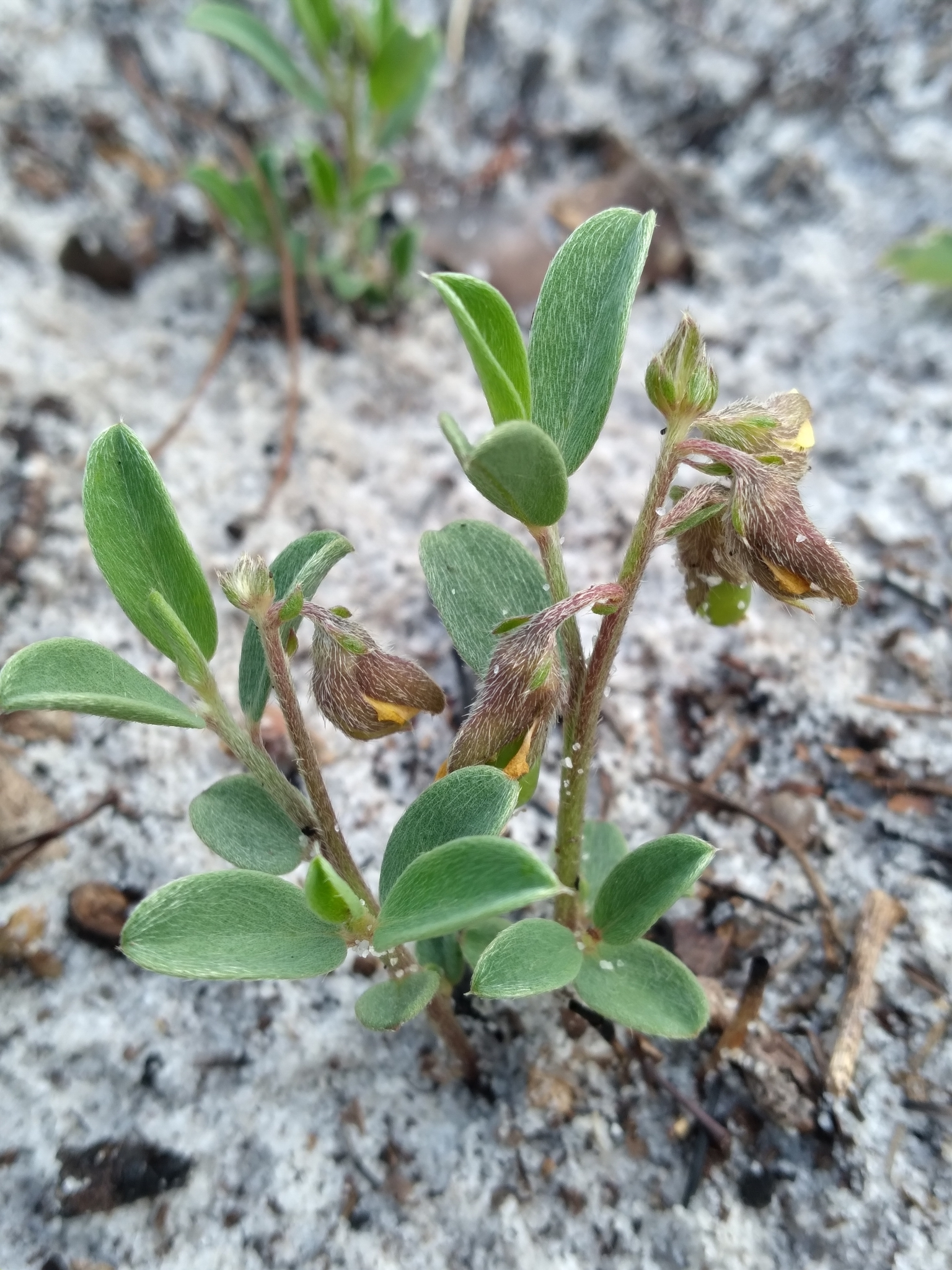

Conservation status
- Critically Imperiled (NatureServe)

- Endangered (ESA)

Scientific classification
- Kingdom: Plantae
- Clade: Tracheophytes
- Clade: Angiosperms
- Clade: Eudicots
- Clade: Rosids
- Order: Fabales
- Family: Fabaceae
- Subfamily: Faboideae
- Genus: Crotalaria
- Species: C. avonensis

Binomial name
- Crotalaria avonensis DeLaney & Wunderlin

= Crotalaria avonensis =

Species of flowering plant

Crotalaria avonensis is a rare species of flowering plant in the legume family known by the common names Avon Park rattlebox, Avon Park harebells, and Avon Park rabbit-bells. It is endemic to Central Florida in the United States, where it is known from only three sites. Many individuals exist on land that is unprotected and they are threatened with destruction. The plant is a federally listed endangered species.

This is a perennial herb with one to three hairy stems growing from a taproot. Most of the stem is located underground, with up to 10 centimeters growing above the surface. The stems are lined with fleshy oval leaves which are coated in white or yellowish hairs. The inflorescence is a raceme of yellow pealike flowers around a centimeter long. The fruit is an inflated legume pod in shades of dark red or brown which can be up to 2.5 centimeters in length and contains 18 seeds. After the plant flowers in spring it becomes dormant for the rest of the year.

It was first collected in 1950 but not recognized as an undescribed species until 1989, when it was named. It grows in the white sand scrub of Florida's Lake Wales Ridge. It can tolerate some disturbance and partially shady conditions. It grows alongside other rare scrub plants such as Small's jointweed (Polygonum dentoceras), Florida lady's nightcap (Bonamia grandiflora), scrub blazing star (Liatris ohlingerae), and Highlands Scrub St. John's wort (Hypericum cumulicola).

The plant is threatened by the degradation and destruction of its habitat. It is limited to a small section of Central Florida which is being consumed for development. Much of its range has been converted to residential neighborhoods or agricultural fields, especially orange groves. Its two populations and one small subpopulation are broken up into scattered, localized occurrences. The largest population is located on private, unprotected land near Avon Park Lakes, a growing residential development. Land that remains there is fragmented and degraded by human activity, such as off-road vehicle use. A nearby subpopulation is estimated to contain fewer than 600 plants. The third location is in better condition and is either declining at a slow rate or stable. It has sustained some damage, including the destruction of living plants, during construction of roads. Other threats to the species include the invasion of non-native plant species such as cogongrass (Imperata cylindrica) and pangolagrass (Digitaria eriantha), dumping of abandoned cars and other garbage, and vandalism. The plant was added to the endangered species list in 1993 along with other rare Florida species, including pigeon wings (Clitoria fragrans), a plant, and Florida perforate cladonia (Cladonia perforata), a lichen.

Many aspects of the plant's life cycle are unknown. Studies indicate it has a low fecundity, probably because of low flower and fruit production. Flowers require pollination by insects, but few insects have been observed at plants. The plant's annual survival rate is apparently quite high but few seeds are produced and few of those germinate. The plant is probably at high risk for extinction, a risk that could be lowered by enacting protection measures for the largest population, which exists tenuously at a site of rapid residential construction. Other conservation efforts underway include cryopreservation of shoot tips, but this plan is not supported by all involved biologists.
