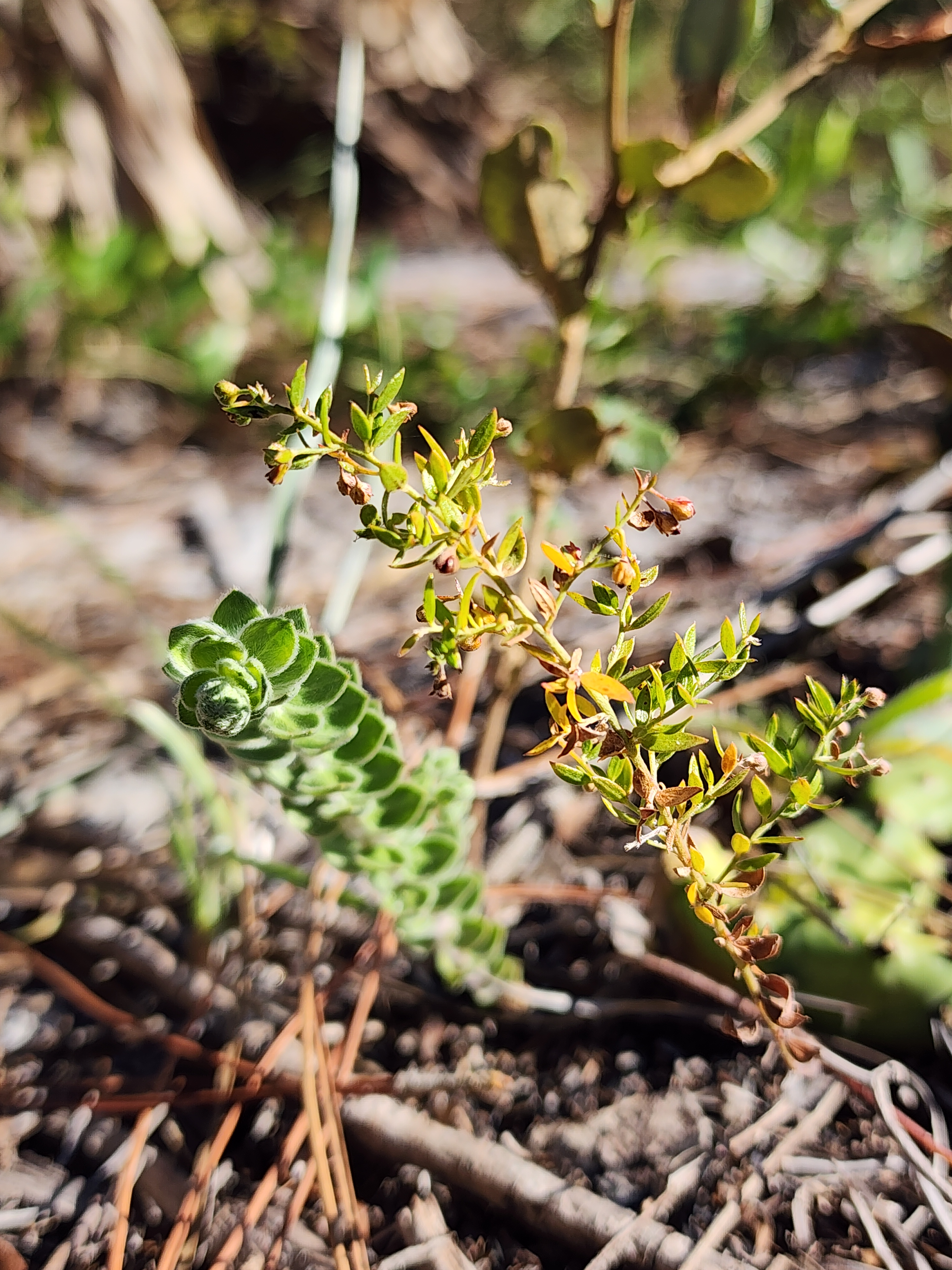
- Difference in form between new growth (left) and mature growth (right, gone to seed)

Conservation status
- Vulnerable (NatureServe)

Scientific classification
- Kingdom: Plantae
- Clade: Tracheophytes
- Clade: Angiosperms
- Clade: Eudicots
- Clade: Rosids
- Order: Malvales
- Family: Cistaceae
- Genus: Lechea
- Species: L. cernua

Binomial name
- Lechea cernua Small

= Lechea cernua =

Species of flowering plant

Lechea cernua, commonly called nodding pinweed and scrub pinweed, is a threatened perennial herb endemic to the U.S. state of Florida.

== Habitat ==
It typically occurs in sandy openings in the fire-maintained xeric habitat of the Florida scrub. It appears to have a particular association with scrub-adapted oaks (which include sand live oak, scrub oak, and Chapman's oak, among others) and Florida rosemary.

== Range ==
Its documented range is limited to the central and southern counties of Florida, where it occurs along both the gulf and Atlantic coasts and down the Lake Wales Ridge, and is known from an estimated 200 to 300 populations across this area. It is facing extreme pressure from habitat loss due to urban sprawl and agriculture.

== Gallery ==
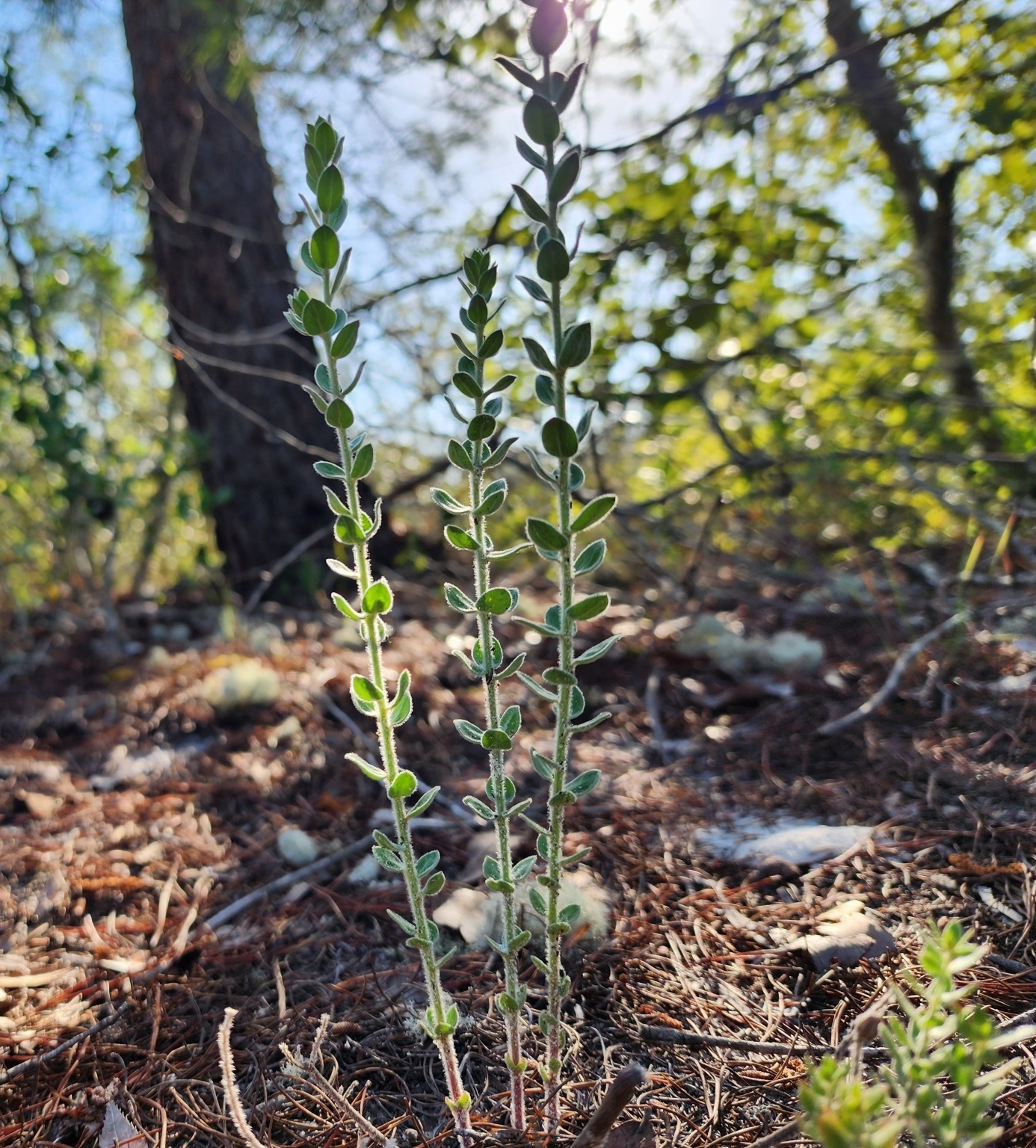
Growing in Lake Wales Ridge State Forest
