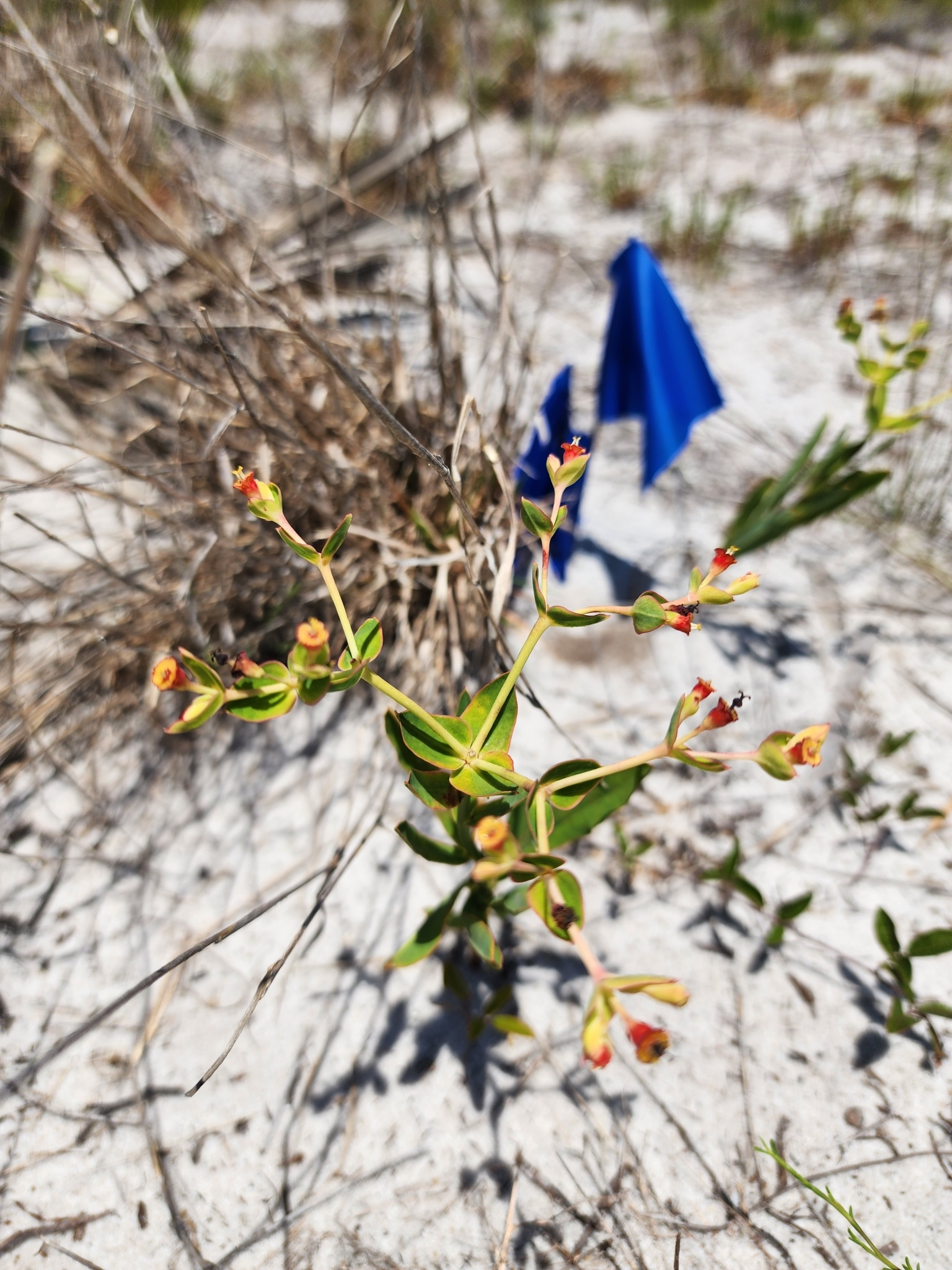
- Euphorbia rosescens specimen flagged for monitoring

Conservation status
- Critically Imperiled (NatureServe)

Scientific classification
- Kingdom: Plantae
- Clade: Tracheophytes
- Clade: Angiosperms
- Clade: Eudicots
- Clade: Rosids
- Order: Malpighiales
- Family: Euphorbiaceae
- Genus: Euphorbia
- Species: E. rosescens

Binomial name
- Euphorbia rosescens E.L.Bridges & Orzell

= Euphorbia rosescens =

Species of flowering plant

Euphorbia rosescens, commonly called scrub spurge or rosy-pink spurge, is a critically endangered perennial herb endemic to the southern Lake Wales Ridge in Highlands County, Florida.

== Habitat ==
It occurs in exposed, sandy soils in the fire-dependent habitats of the Florida scrub. It seems to prefer local depressions in deep, white sand scrubs where it may form associations with Florida rosemary and scrub-adapted oaks (including sand live oak, scrub oak, and Chapman's oak, among others).

== Description ==
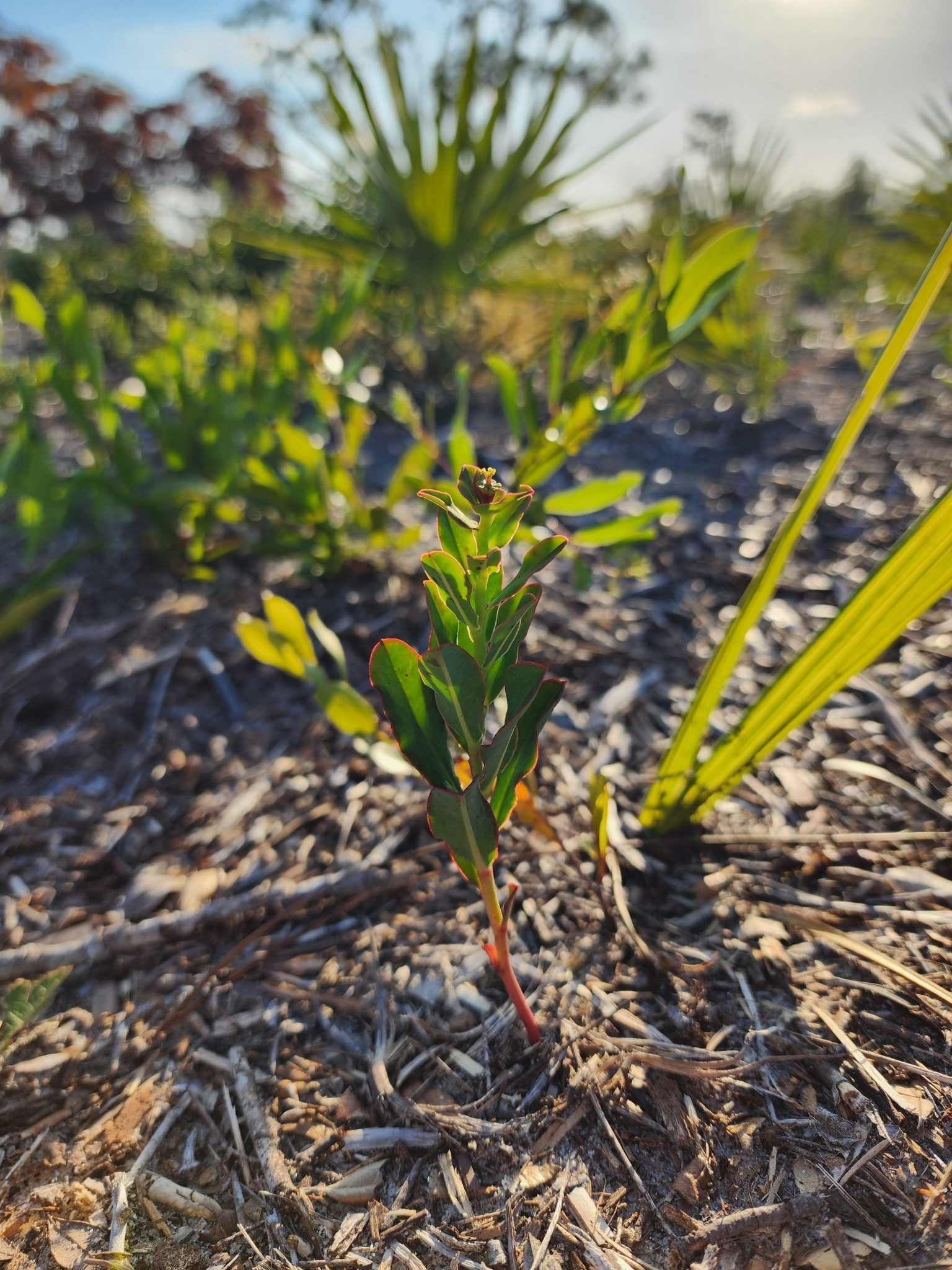
Resprouted after being mulched

Despite its diminutive size, the plant is deeply-rooted with roughly fifty times more biomass below-ground than above-ground. This aids it in being resilient to disturbance once established, with individuals frequently resprouting after fire or mechanical disturbance.

== Conservation ==
A relatively recently described species, its conservation status under federal and state listings is unclear. However, NatureServe has listed the species as at extreme risk due to habitat loss and habitat fragmentation as the southern Lake Wales Ridge continues a rapid rate of development for real estate and agriculture. The species is known to exist in less than 20 known sites, though not all sites are thought to support healthy populations.

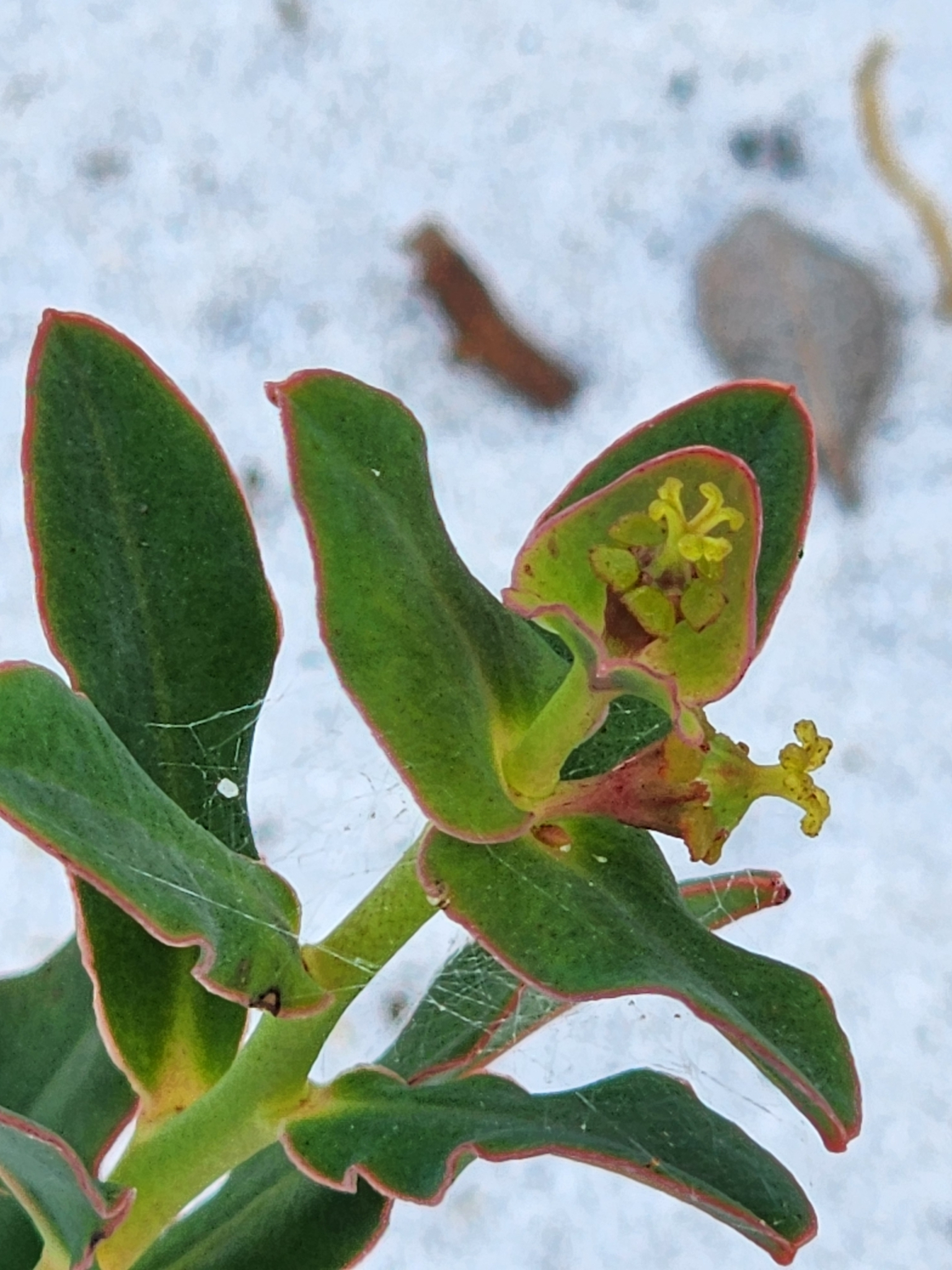
Flowering structure

Despite its locally stable subpopulations with >90% year-to-year survival, the species is challenged by its low fecundity. Observed subpopulations appear to either be all female or a mix of male and andromonoecious individuals, with females being the predominant flowerers and fruit production being low. Fire has been noted to simultaneously have negative long-term consequences for survival but short-term benefits to flowering rates.

== Gallery ==
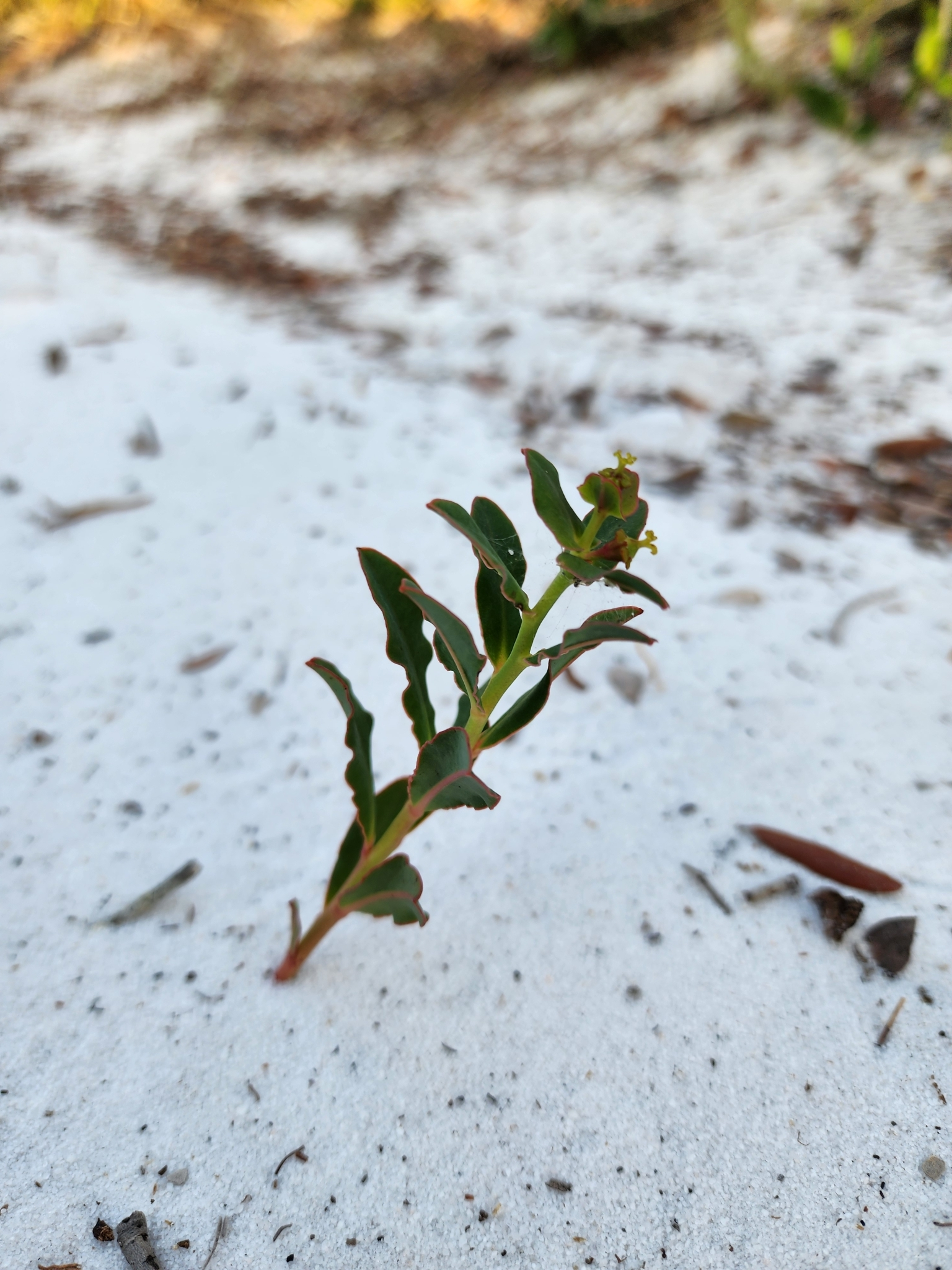
Specimen growing in trail used for low-volume vehicular traffic

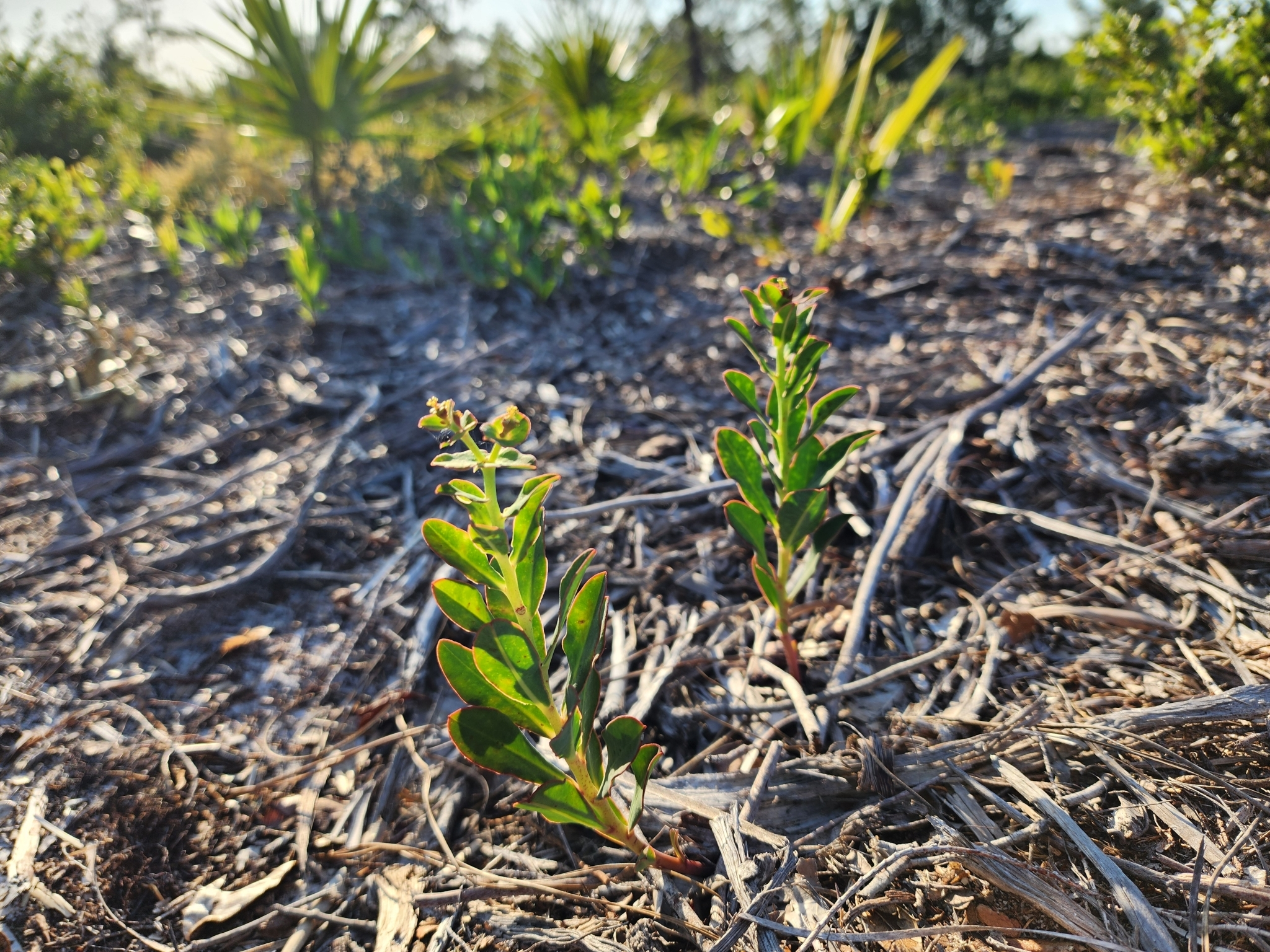
Specimens resprouting after previously being mulched

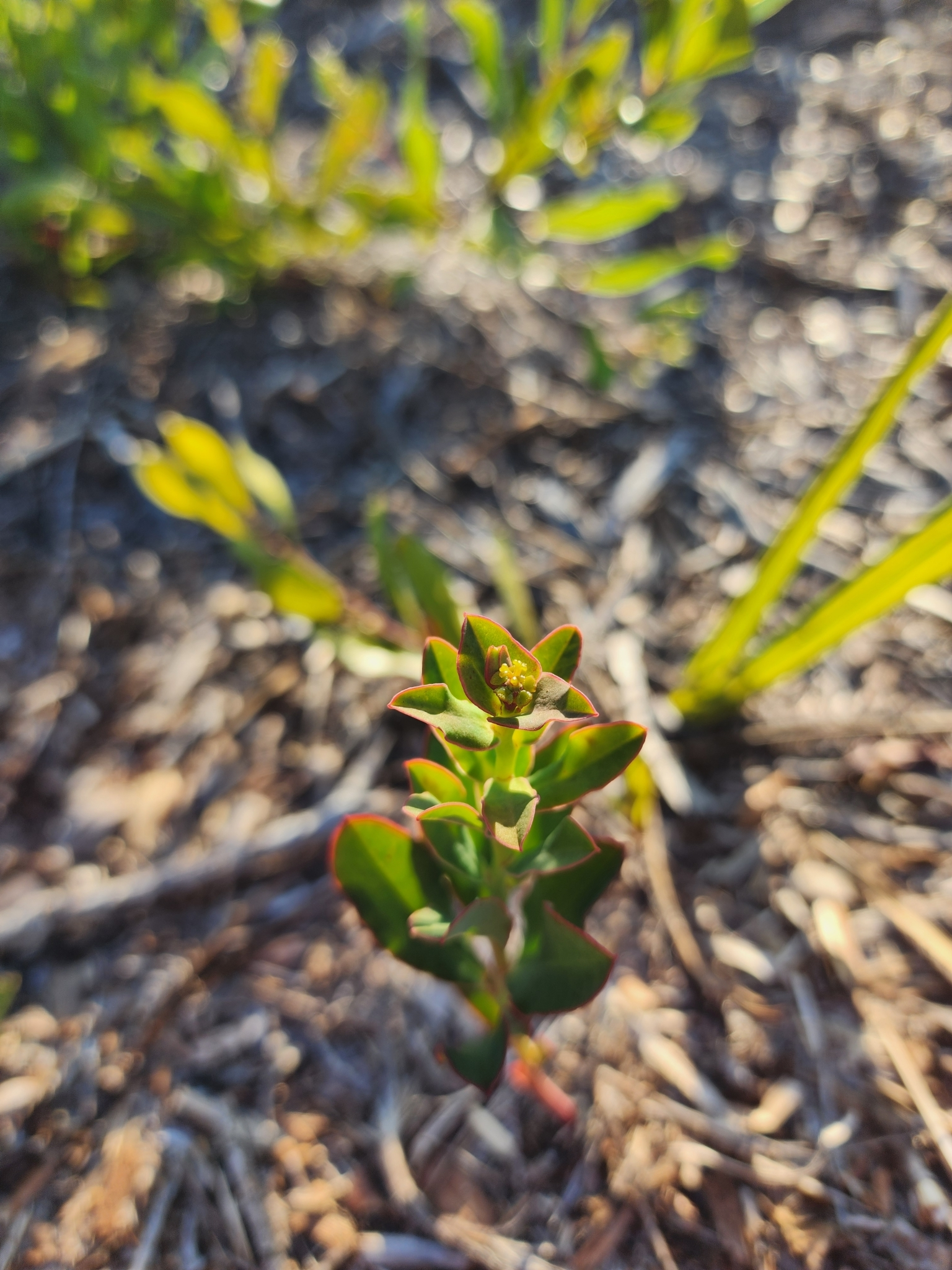
Close-up of resprouted specimen
