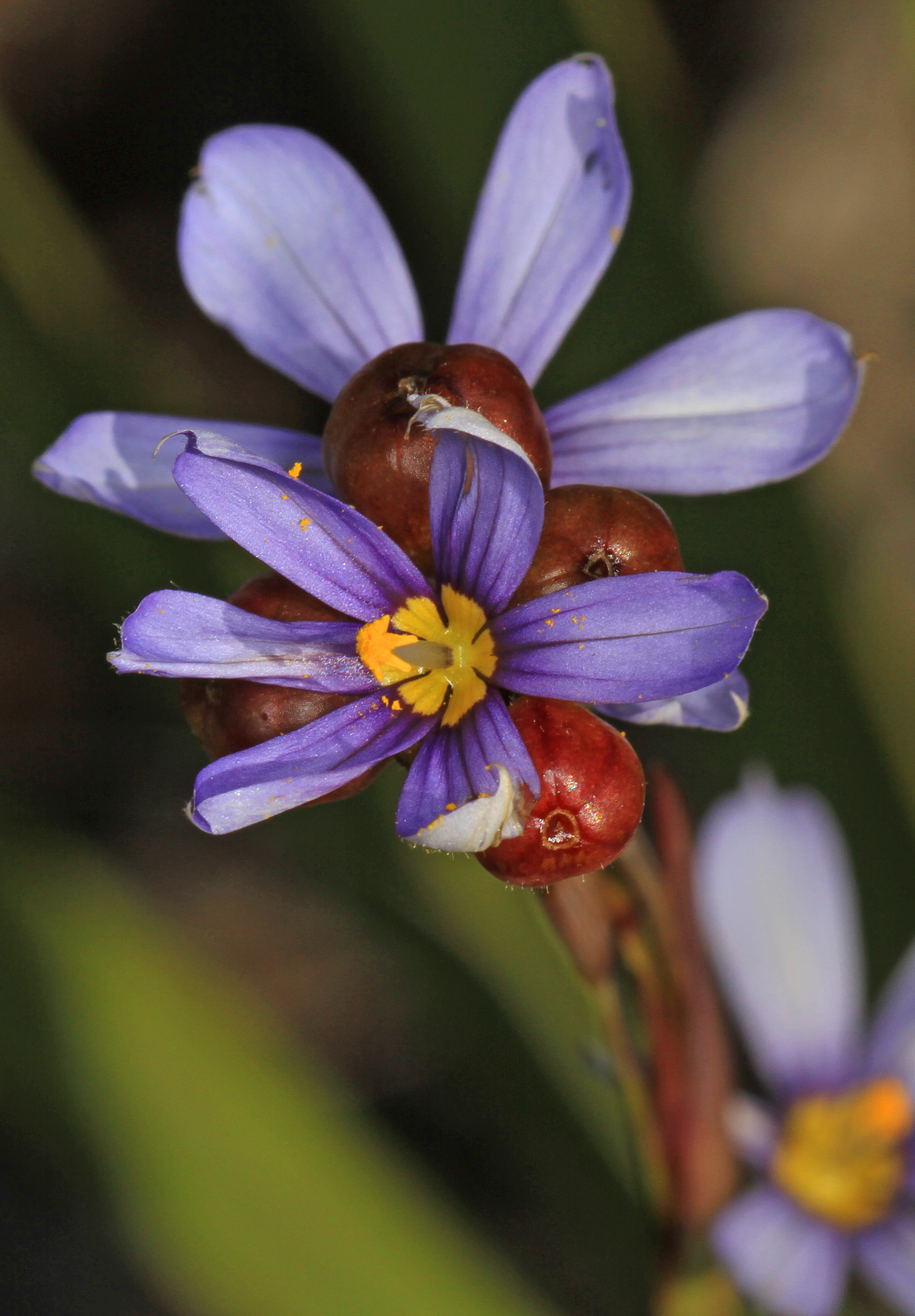

Conservation status
- Vulnerable (NatureServe)

Scientific classification
- Kingdom: Plantae
- Clade: Embryophytes
- Clade: Tracheophytes
- Clade: Spermatophytes
- Clade: Angiosperms
- Clade: Monocots
- Order: Asparagales
- Family: Iridaceae
- Genus: Sisyrinchium
- Species: S. xerophyllum

Binomial name
- Sisyrinchium xerophyllum Greene

= Sisyrinchium xerophyllum =

Species of flowering plant

Sisyrinchium xerophyllum, commonly called jeweled blue-eyed grass or scrub blue-eyed grass, is a threatened species of perennial herb endemic to the U.S. southeast coastal plain where it is primarily found in Florida with some possible scattered populations in Georgia and North Carolina.

== Habitat ==
It occurs in the exposed, sandy soils of the fire-dependent habitats of sandhill and scrub.

== Conservation ==
Its full range and abundance are not well-documented. Due to its restricted habitat requirements and known range, it is considered a threatened species, both globally and in Florida specifically.
