= Hogna ericeticola =

Conservation status
- Data Deficient (IUCN 2.3)

- Critically Imperiled (NatureServe)

Scientific classification
- Kingdom: Animalia
- Phylum: Arthropoda
- Subphylum: Chelicerata
- Class: Arachnida
- Order: Araneae
- Infraorder: Araneomorphae
- Family: Lycosidae
- Genus: Hogna
- Species: H. ericeticola

Binomial name
- Hogna ericeticola (Wallace, 1942)

Synonyms
- Lycosa ericeticola Isohogna ericeticola

Species of spider

Hogna ericeticola, known as the rosemary wolf spider, is a species of spider in the family Lycosidae. It is endemic to Florida scrub habitats in Putnam County, Florida in the United States.
