= Lake Wales Ridge State Forest =

Lake in Florida, USA

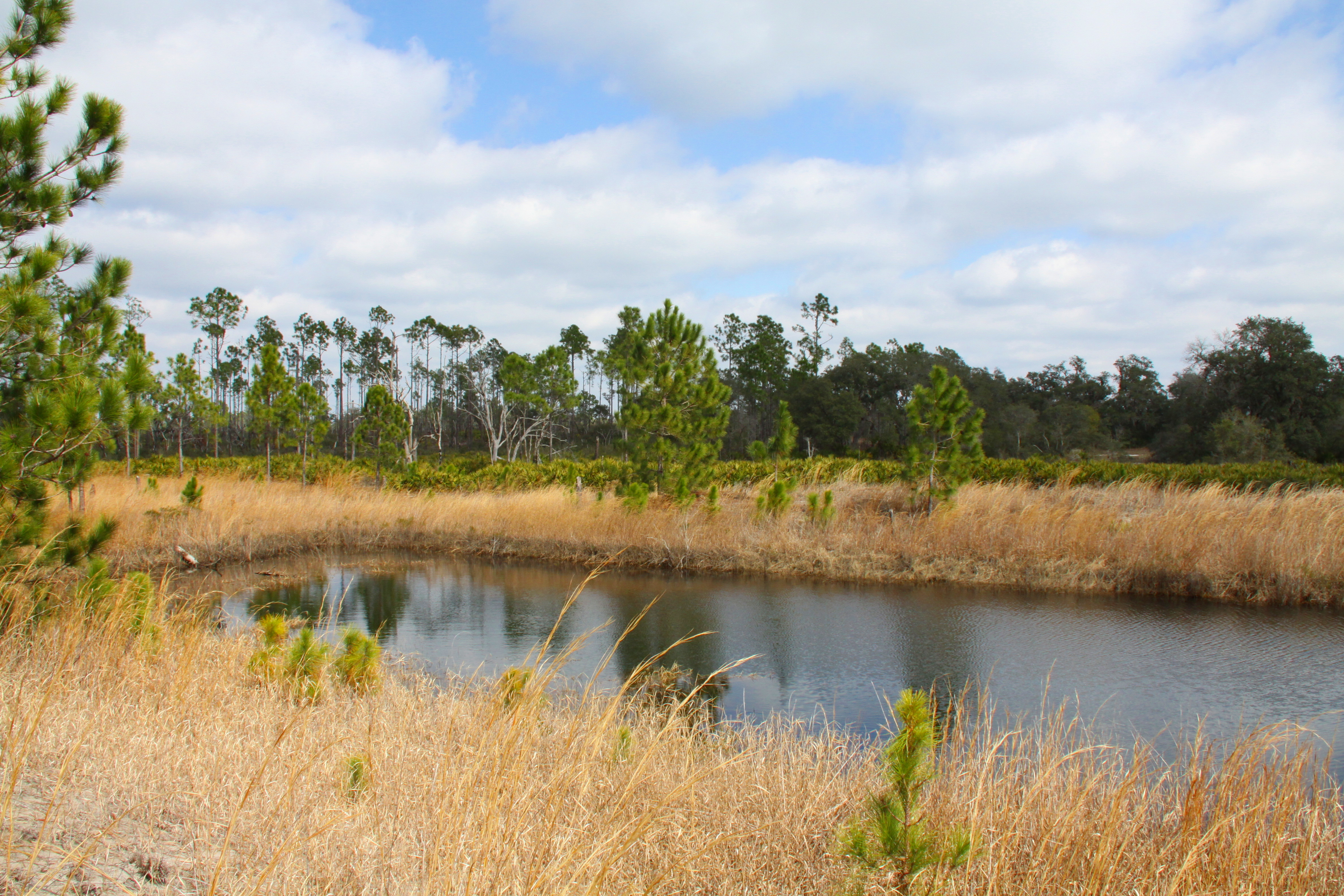
- Marshland in Scrub-Jay Loop Trail, Lake Wales Ridge State Forest, February 2010
- Interactive map of Lake Wales Ridge State Forest
- Location: Polk County, Florida
- Nearest city: Frostproof
- Area: 26,563 acres (10,750 ha)
- Governing body: Florida Department of Environmental Protection

The Lake Wales Ridge State Forest is in the U.S. state of Florida. The 26,563-acre (107 km^{2}) forest is located on the Lake Wales Ridge in Central Florida, within Polk County near Frostproof.

The state forest consists of four tracts: Arbuckle, Walk in Water, Hesperides, and Prairie. The Walk in Water Tract, adjoining Lake Weohyakapka (Lake Walk in Water), contains the largest contiguous area of ridge sandhill in public ownership. The Arbuckle Tract, adjoining Lake Arbuckle to the south, is a good example of an ancient scrub ecosystem. Both tracts are open to the public and include hiking trails. Both tracts provide protected habitat for plant species endemic to Florida scrub.
