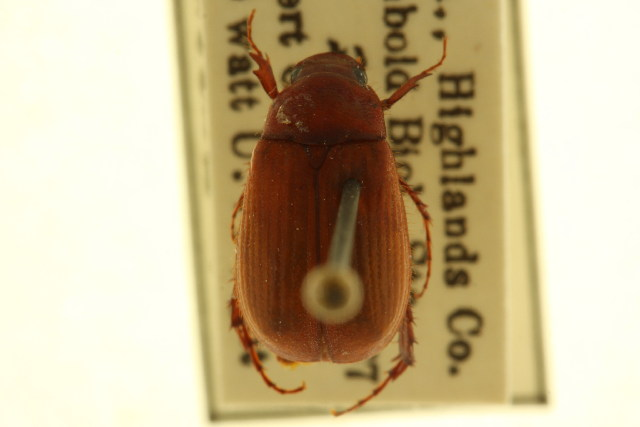

Scientific classification
- Kingdom: Animalia
- Phylum: Arthropoda
- Class: Insecta
- Order: Coleoptera
- Suborder: Polyphaga
- Infraorder: Scarabaeiformia
- Family: Scarabaeidae
- Genus: Serica
- Species: S. frosti

Binomial name
- Serica frosti Dawson, 1967

= Serica frosti =

Species of beetle

Serica frosti is a species of beetle of the family Scarabaeidae. It is found in the United States (Florida).

== Description ==
Adults reach a length of about 7 mm. The colour is light chestnut brown with a thin rainbow iridescence, nearly without pubescence except for some fine, brown hairs on the front and middle legs.
