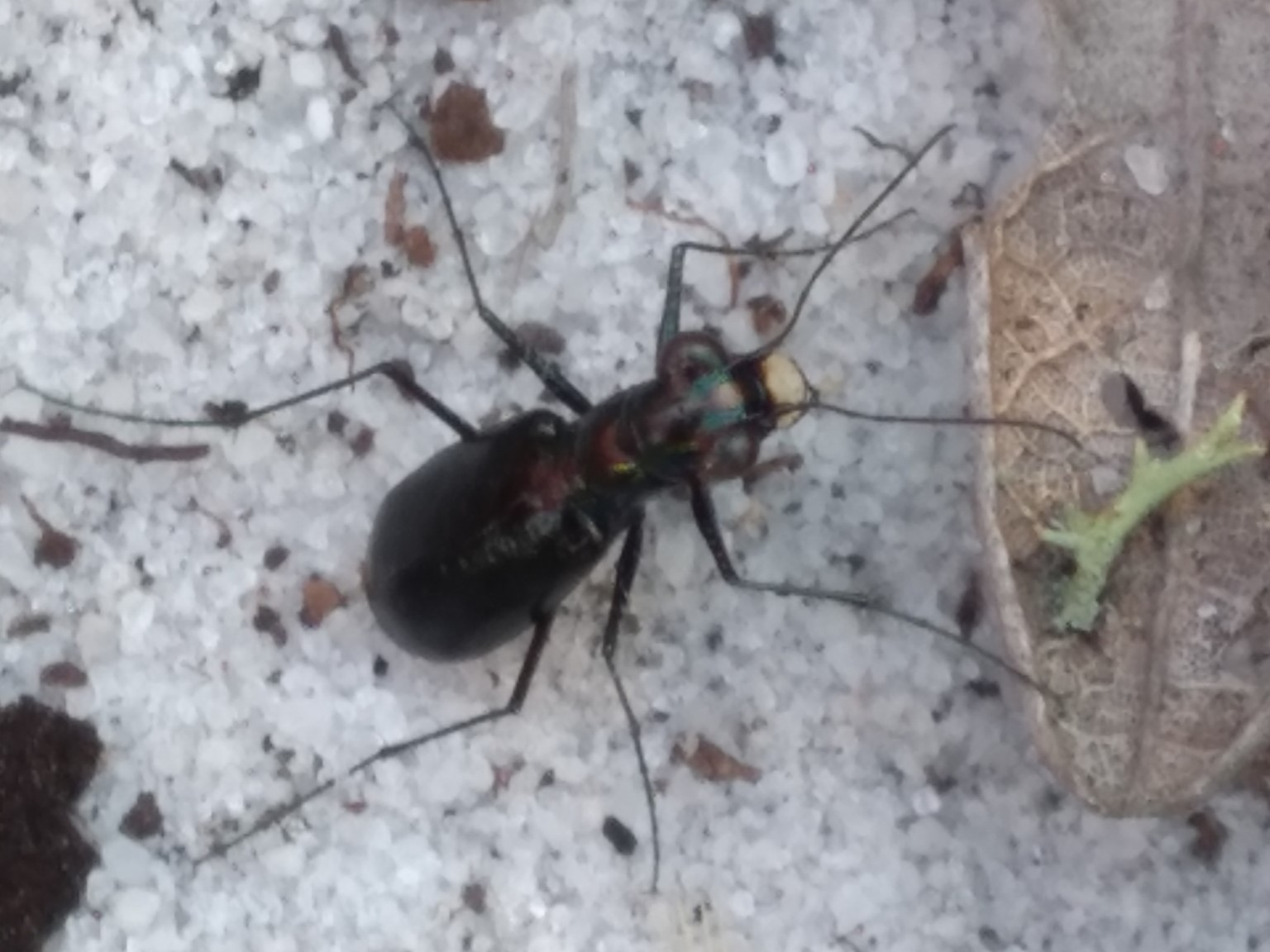

Scientific classification
- Kingdom: Animalia
- Phylum: Arthropoda
- Class: Insecta
- Order: Coleoptera
- Suborder: Adephaga
- Family: Cicindelidae
- Genus: Cicindela
- Species: C. highlandensis

Binomial name
- Cicindela highlandensis Choate, 1984

= Cicindela highlandensis =

Species of beetle

Cicindela highlandensis, commonly known as the Highlands tiger beetle, is a species of ground beetle in the family Cicindelidae. It is endemic to central Florida in the United States. It is rare and a candidate for federal protection.

== Description ==
Cicindela highlandensis is mainly black in color and measures 10.5 to 12 millimeters in length.

== Distribution and habitat ==
Cicindela highlandensis is limited to the Lake Wales Ridge. It lives in scrub and sandhill habitat with very sandy substrates and surroundings featuring evergreen scrub oaks, turkey oaks, and longleaf pines. The beetle can be found in open areas, and generally not densely vegetated parts of the habitat. It can sometimes be found on trails and paths.

== Threats ==
An important threat to the survival of this species is habitat loss. Most of the Lake Wales Ridge has been altered or degraded. Its natural vegetation has been lost during development, conversion to citrus groves, and fire suppression. The beetle does not live in dense patches of vegetation, preferring open areas; fire suppression has allowed the overgrowth of plant matter, reducing the available habitat for the beetle.
