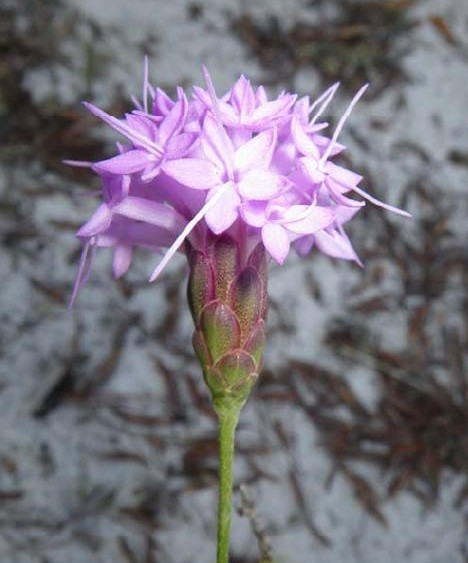

Conservation status
- Imperiled (NatureServe)

Scientific classification
- Kingdom: Plantae
- Clade: Tracheophytes
- Clade: Angiosperms
- Clade: Eudicots
- Clade: Asterids
- Order: Asterales
- Family: Asteraceae
- Genus: Liatris
- Species: L. ohlingerae

Binomial name
- Liatris ohlingerae (S.F.Blake) B.L.Rob.

= Liatris ohlingerae =

Species of flowering plant

Liatris ohlingerae is a rare species of flowering plant in the family Asteraceae known by the common names Florida blazing star, Florida gayfeather, scrub blazing star, and sandtorch. It is endemic to Florida in the United States, where it occurs only on the Lake Wales Ridge along with many other rare plants. It is threatened by the loss and degradation of its habitat, and it is federally listed as an endangered species.

This is a perennial herb growing 30 centimeters to one meter in height from a cylindrical corm. The glandular leaves are linear in shape and the longest near the base of the plant may reach 15 centimeters long. The inflorescence is a flower head containing up to 30 disc florets. It is lined with purple-edged green phyllaries and contains tubular lavender corollas.

This plant grows in Florida scrub habitat on the Lake Wales Ridge of Central Florida. It grows on rosemary balds in areas of sand pine scrub, open areas where sunlight reaches through the canopy of taller vegetation. It also grows in the ecotone between open sunny areas and shaded understory, showing some preference for shade. It often grows beneath Florida rosemary (Ceratiola ericoides) bushes, and is apparently resistant to the allelopathic compounds the rosemary produces. It is pollinated by butterflies. This relationship is necessary for the plant's reproduction, because it is self-incompatible, unable to fertilize itself. The plant is relatively long-lived, often living over nine years.

Herbivory often impacts the plant. Its flower production is reduced as the plants are "topped" by browsing vertebrates, particularly white-tailed deer (Odocoileus virginianus). Up to 30% of flower buds are consumed by boring insects. After the seeds are dispersed they are heavily predated by insects and vertebrates.

As of 2009 there were 91 occurrences of the plant. Some are on protected land, so their habitat will not be lost to development or agriculture. However, even protected land is often improperly managed. It lacks the natural fire regime on which the Florida scrub ecosystem depends. When fire burns the habitat, this plant can resprout from its corm.
