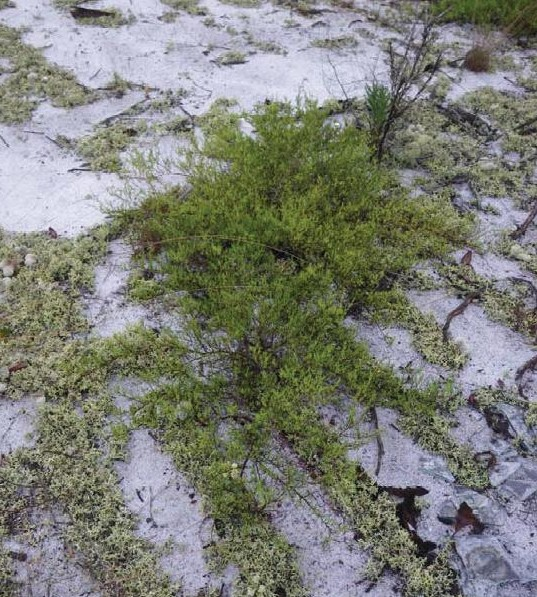

Conservation status
- Vulnerable (NatureServe)

Scientific classification
- Kingdom: Plantae
- Clade: Tracheophytes
- Clade: Angiosperms
- Clade: Eudicots
- Order: Caryophyllales
- Family: Polygonaceae
- Genus: Polygonum
- Species: P. dentoceras

Binomial name
- Polygonum dentoceras T.M.Schust. & Reveal

Synonyms
- Dentoceras myriophylla Small; Polygonella myriophylla (Small) Horton

= Polygonum dentoceras =

Species of flowering plant

Polygonum dentoceras (synonym Polygonella myriophylla) is a rare species of flowering plant in the knotweed family known by the common names sandlace, woody wireweed, and Small's jointweed. It is endemic to Florida in the United States, where it is limited to the central ridges of the peninsula, including the Lake Wales Ridge. It is threatened by the loss and degradation of its habitat. It is a federally listed endangered species of the United States.

== Description ==
This plant is a mat-forming subshrub which spreads along the ground and grows up to 2 meters long. The sprawling branches have shreddy bark. The leaves are needle-like and under a centimeter long. The small inflorescence contains white, pink or yellow flowers each 1 or 2 millimeters long. The plant reproduces sexually via its seeds and vegetatively by cloning. It engages in allelopathy, the release of chemicals including gallic acid and hydroquinone, to prevent other plants from growing directly next to it.

== Taxonomy ==
The species was first described in 1924 by John Kunkel Small as Dentoceras myriophylla. It was later transferred to the genus Polygonella. In 2015, following a series of molecular phylogenetic studies, the genus Polygonella was subsumed into Polygonum. However, the name "Polygonum myriophylla" was unavailable, so the replacement name Polygonum dentoceras was published in 2011.

== Ecology and conservation ==
Visitors to the flowers include the bee Dialectus placidensis, the shore fly Allotrichoma abdominalis, and the hairstreak butterfly Hemiargus ceraunus.

This plant is a member of the Florida scrub plant community. It occurs in dry white-sand scrub dominated by Florida rosemary, as well as oak scrub, flatwoods, roadsides, and occasionally sandhills.

Threats to this species include the destruction of its habitat during the conversion to residential and agricultural property, particularly citrus groves. Fire suppression may have a negative effect on this plant, because it is adapted to a habitat that depends on wildfire.

As of 2010 there were 140 occurrences. It is difficult to count or estimate the number of individuals, because what may appear to be many separate individuals may be the clones of one plant.
