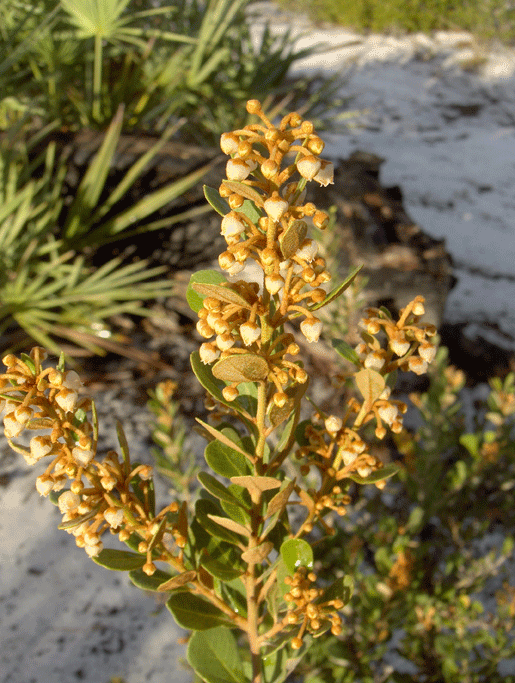

Conservation status
- Secure (NatureServe)

Scientific classification
- Kingdom: Plantae
- Clade: Tracheophytes
- Clade: Angiosperms
- Clade: Eudicots
- Clade: Asterids
- Order: Ericales
- Family: Ericaceae
- Genus: Lyonia
- Species: L. ferruginea

Binomial name
- Lyonia ferruginea (Michx.) G.S. Torr.

Synonyms
- Andromeda ferruginea var. fruticosa Michx.; Xolisma ferruginea (Michx.) Nash

= Lyonia ferruginea =

Rusty staggerbush

Species of flowering plant

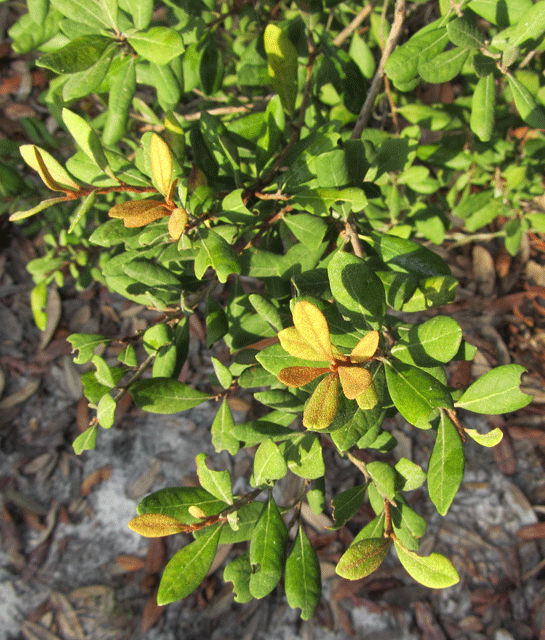
Showing rusty colored newer growth

Lyonia ferruginea, the rusty staggerbush, tree lyonia, dragon tree, is a plant of the genus Lyonia. It grows in Florida, Georgia, and South Carolina. It was first described by Thomas Walter, and was named by Thomas Nuttall. No subspecies are listed in the Catalog of Life.

In 1848, it was reported in Georgia, Florida, and Mexico. It flowers in the summer.
