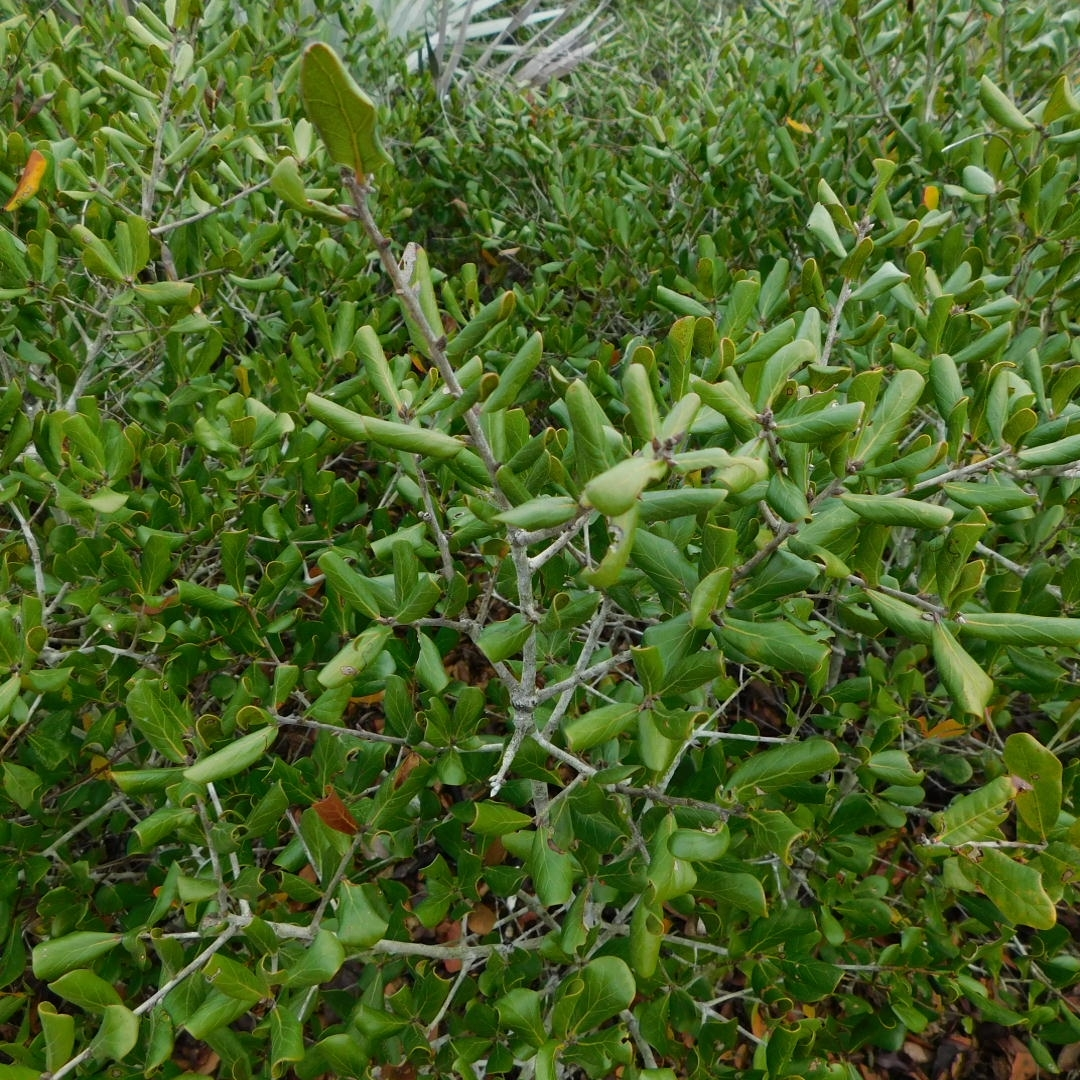

Conservation status
- Least Concern (IUCN 3.1)

- Apparently Secure (NatureServe)

Scientific classification
- Kingdom: Plantae
- Clade: Embryophytes
- Clade: Tracheophytes
- Clade: Spermatophytes
- Clade: Angiosperms
- Clade: Eudicots
- Clade: Rosids
- Order: Fagales
- Family: Fagaceae
- Genus: Quercus
- Subgenus: Quercus subg. Quercus
- Section: Quercus sect. Lobatae
- Species: Q. inopina

Binomial name
- Quercus inopina Ashe 1929
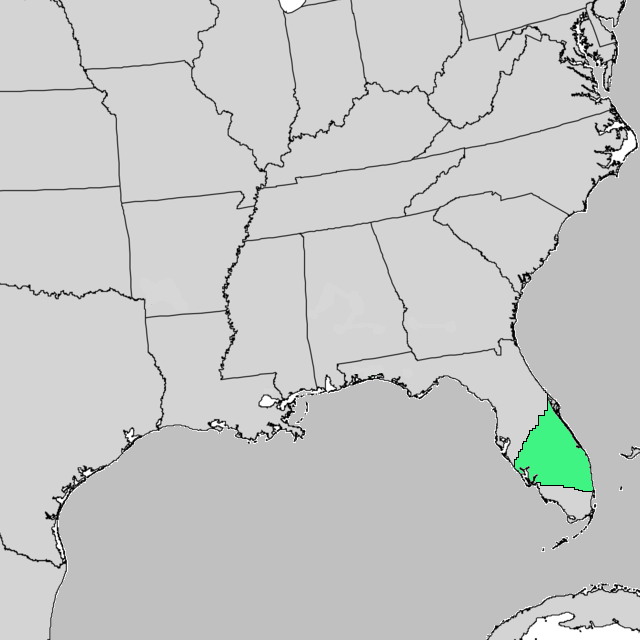
- Natural range

= Quercus inopina =

Species of shrub

Quercus inopina, the sandhill oak, is an uncommon North American species of oak shrub. It has been found only in the state of Florida in the southeastern United States.

It is a branching shrub up to 5 meters (17 feet) in height. The bark is gray, twigs purplish brown. The leaves are broad, up to 85 millimeters (3 3/8 inches) long, usually hairless, with no teeth or lobes.
