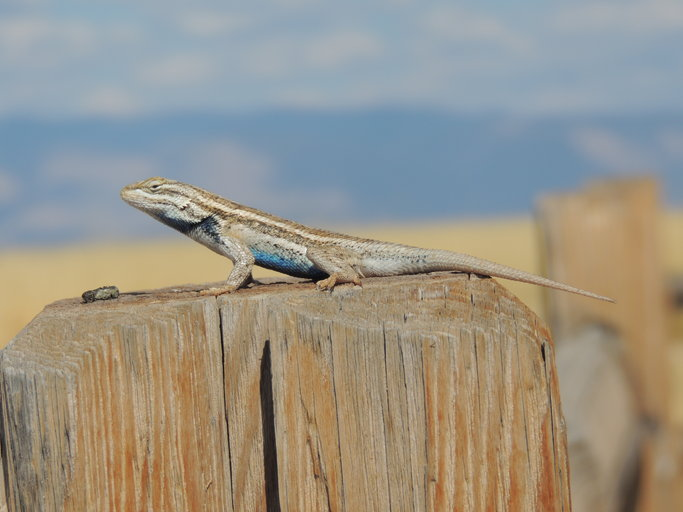
- Male Sceloporus cowlesi in New Mexico

Scientific classification
- Kingdom: Animalia
- Phylum: Chordata
- Class: Reptilia
- Order: Squamata
- Suborder: Iguania
- Family: Phrynosomatidae
- Genus: Sceloporus
- Species: S. cowlesi

Binomial name
- Sceloporus cowlesi Lowe & Norris, 1956

Synonyms
- Sceloporus undulatus cowlesi Lowe & Norris, 1956; Sceloporus cowlesi — Leaché & Reeder, 2002

= Southwestern fence lizard =

Species of lizard

The southwestern fence lizard (Sceloporus cowlesi), also known as Cowles' prairie lizard, the White Sands prairie lizard or the White Sands swift, is species of spiny lizard in the family Iguanidae. The species is native to the Chihuahuan Desert of the south-western United States and north-central Mexico. Originally described in 1956 as Sceloporus undulatus cowlesi, a subspecies of the eastern fence lizard, subsequent DNA studies elevated the southwestern fence lizard to species status.

The following cladogram is based on Leaché and Reeder, 2002, and shows the relationship of Sceloporus cowlesi to other species in the "Sceloporus undulatus group".

- - - S. undulatus species group
      - - S. cowlesi
        - S. cautus
      - - - S. tristichus
          - - S. consobrinus
            - S. woodi
        - S. undulatus
    - S. virgatus
  - S. occidentalis

== Etymology ==
The specific name, cowlesi, is in honor of American herpetologist Raymond Bridgman Cowles.
