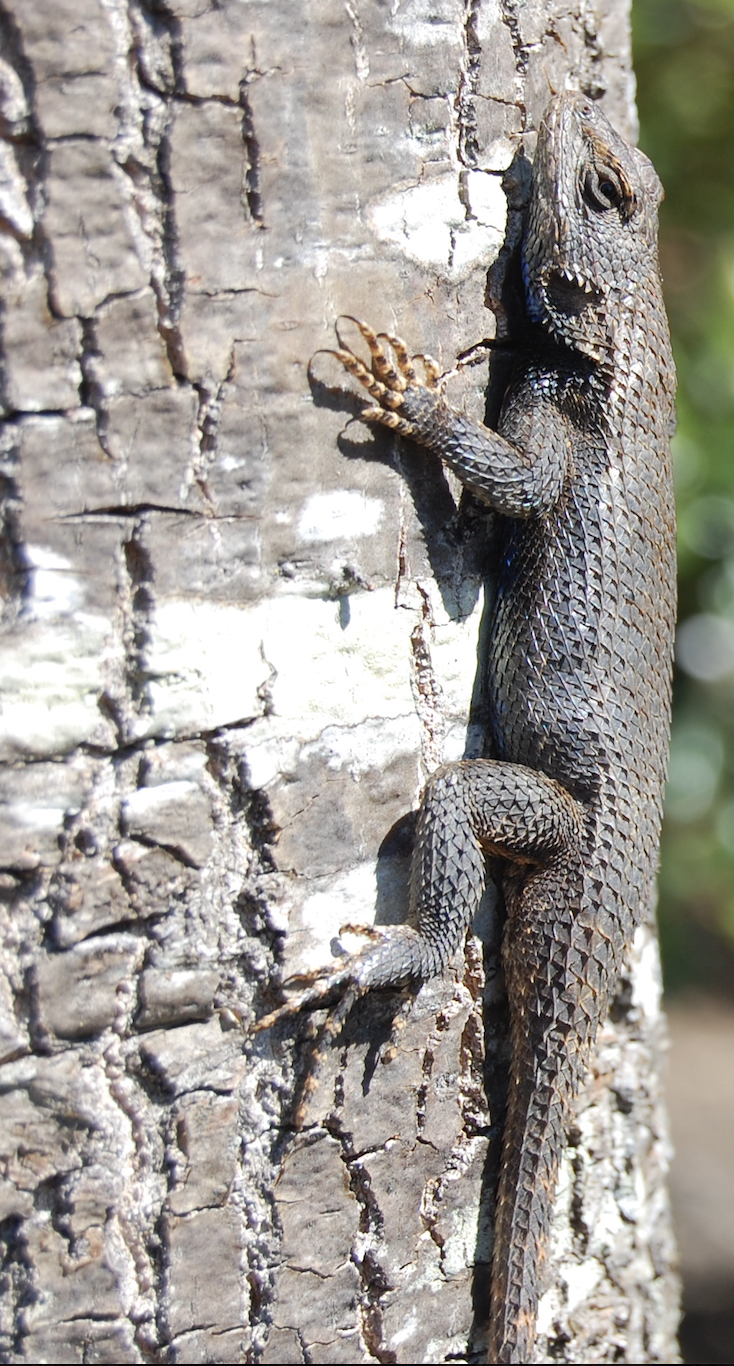
- Eastern fence lizard (Sceloporus undulatus), Amelia Court House, VA

Conservation status
- Least Concern (IUCN 3.1)

Scientific classification
- Kingdom: Animalia
- Phylum: Chordata
- Order: Squamata
- Suborder: Iguania
- Family: Phrynosomatidae
- Genus: Sceloporus
- Species: S. undulatus

Binomial name
- Sceloporus undulatus (Bosc & Daudin, 1801)

Synonyms
- Stellio undulatus Bosc & Daudin, 1801; Lacerta undulata — Bosc, 1801; Agama undulata — Daudin, 1802; Tropidolepis undulatus — A.M.C. Duméril & Bibron, 1837; Sceloporus undulatus — Boulenger, 1885

= Eastern fence lizard =

Species of lizard

The eastern fence lizard (Sceloporus undulatus) is a medium-sized species of lizard in the family Phrynosomatidae. The species is found along forest edges, rock piles, and rotting logs or stumps in the eastern United States. It is sometimes referred to as the fence swift, gray lizard, gravid lizard, northern fence lizard or pine lizard. It is also referred to colloquially as the horn-billed lizard. One of its most notable behaviors is that of its escape behavior when encountering fire ants, which have been known to invade and negatively affect many of their populations.

== Taxonomy ==
The generic name, Sceloporus, is derived from the Greek skelos/σκελος, meaning "leg", and the Latin porus, meaning "hole", referring to the enlarged femoral pores found in this genus of lizards. The specific name, undulatus, is Latin for "wave", referring to the transverse dark crossbars on the backs of these lizards.

Until 2002, 10 subspecies of S. undulatus were recognized, but re-evaluation showed paraphyly between the subspecies. These were reclassified as four distinct evolutionary species (the three new species being S. consobrinus, S. tristichus, and S. cowlesi). The narrowed redefinition of S. undulatus has been suggested to still contain two subspecies divided by the Appalachian Mountains. None currently hold formal recognition. This variation can be partially attributed to the high nucleotide variation. One study found an average of 38 SNPs per kilobase of DNA.

The following cladogram is based on Leaché and Reeder, 2002:

- - - Sceloporus undulatus species group
      - - S. cowlesi
        - S. cautus
      - - - S. tristichus
          - - S. consobrinus
            - S. woodi
        - S. undulatus
    - S. virgatus
  - S. occidentalis

== Description ==
The eastern fence lizard can grow from 4.0 to 7.5 inches (10 to 19 cm) in total length (including tail). This species is a sexually size dimorphic lizard, where the females are larger than the males. It is typically colored in shades of gray or brown, and has keeled scales, with a dark line running along the rear of the thigh. A female is usually gray and has a series of dark, wavy lines across her back. The belly is white with black flecks, with some pale blue on the throat and belly. The male is usually brown, and during the summer, has a more greenish-blue and black coloration on the sides of the belly and throat than the female. The young look like the females, but are darker and duller. Both sexes have keeled scales.

The lizards mostly inhabit sparsely wooded areas with ample sunlight, such as pine barrens with sandy or loose soil. They can be found basking atop of both natural and artificial structures including coarse woody debris, tree stumps, rock piles, sandy hills, dead logs, and fence posts. They are most active in the early morning sun when the ground has not been fully warmed up yet. They seek refuge under structures such as woodpiles, logs, and rocks for coverage and protection when it gets too hot and at night.

=== Sexual dichromatism ===
This species has sexual dichromatism, which is a difference in coloration between the sexes. Males are blue and black on their ventral side. In some lizards, this coloration appears green or turquoise. In males, these patches assist intraspecific sex recognition and signaling. The size of patches correlates with the size of a lizard, and therefore may be a signal towards females or other antagonistic lizards. Males are somewhat uniformly brown elsewhere with a reddish tinge.

Females and juveniles are slightly colored blue and black on the ventral side or not at all. Their coloring is more complex, with "rows of dark brown or black chevrons set against a background of gray and brown."

This sexual dichromatism is correlated to and somewhat regulated by plasma levels of testosterone in juveniles and adult females. Higher levels of testosterone support stronger blue and black ventral coloration.

Male eastern fence lizards can also experience short-term color changes on their dorsal side and badge after exposure to temperature changes. The color of a lizard affects its social dominance or inferiority, camouflage, and self-regulation of temperature. Social dominance as a result of lizard color may exist because coloration would then possibly provide an honest indicator of lizard temperature and health.

It is thought that sexual dimorphism and sexual differences in behavior may be due to differences in androgen concentration and receptor immunoreactivity.

== Habitat and distribution ==
The eastern fence lizard is found in Mississippi, Alabama, Georgia, Kentucky, Tennessee, North Carolina, South Carolina, West Virginia, Virginia, Maryland, southeastern Indiana, southern Ohio, southern Pennsylvania, southern New Jersey, western Delaware, and northwestern Florida. It prefers open woodland and the edges of forests. This species is known to enjoy pine trees, and is often dubbed "pine lizard". Adults and juveniles prefer habitats with a high amount of rocks and coarse woody debris while hatchlings prefer sites with high temperatures (23 degrees Celsius) and low amounts of litter.

There are some introduced populations of eastern fence lizards, the most well known in Staten Island, New York. In 1942, Carl Kauffeld released 29 of the lizards near Rossville where they still persist today in post oak-blackjack oak barrens. This introduction was done so Kauffeld could have an easy source of food for the lizard-eating snakes at the Staten Island Zoo, as he would otherwise have to drive to the Pine Barrens to collect the lizards for the snakes. There have also been sightings of the fence lizards in northern Pennsylvania and southern New York (in the Hudson Valley and Long Island), suggesting that their range may be expanding north.

Despite its broad geographic distribution, these lizards tend to prefer temperatures that optimize their digestive performance. Their locomotive performance is optimal over a relatively broad range of body temperature.

=== Regional variation ===
The eastern fence lizard has several adaptations to better survive in colder regions of its distribution, including larger eggs, more efficient embryonic development, and shorter incubation times. The larger egg sizes are not a result of greater maternal investment — even when forcibly made smaller, efficiency and incubation time were similar to the originally larger eggs.

On the other hand, female lizards in southern regions produce second clutches more often, although their clutches are smaller than northern ones. The season at which eggs can incubate and lizards may be active is longer in the southern regions.

The overall reproductive success of both northern and southern lizards are approximately equal, given that all else (i.e. body size) is equal.

== Behavior and ecology ==
When climate conditions are stable, fence lizards prefer to sleep in the same site over short periods of time. The site selected is within the lizard's home range or territory. When climate conditions are not stable, it has been found that some eastern fence lizards have been able to survive small frozen periods, and then return to normal after the period is over.

=== Locomotion ===
The running speed of these lizards is not limited by their mechanical power output. As the slope of the terrain increases, running speed and stamina of lizards decreases. Eastern fence lizards run faster uphill than downhill at a fixed degree of incline or decline. Lizards with higher running speeds also have higher stamina in regard to time and distance.

=== Territoriality and conflict ===
Male eastern fence lizards will establish a territory in the early spring, doing push-ups to flash their blue scales and deter other males. Males will flash the blue coloration on their bellies to claim territory. Males will headbob more at males with smaller ventral patches, but aggressiveness is not affected by male patches.

The size of a male's territory (home range area) is directly correlated with his body size. The territory of smaller males in their first breeding season tends to be smaller. Territories may overlap; about half of any given male's territory is shared by another male. Within their territory, males cluster around the ranges of females, who are a limited resource. As such, the range and distribution of males is predominantly determined by the distribution of nearby females.

=== Courting ===
Courting begins after female fence lizards encounter a male within his territory. Males express sexually dimorphic ventral abdominal coloration during courting. This coloration is used to attract mates, as more and brighter colors have been recorded to increase the likelihood of courtship.

In 60% of instances where a female and male encountered each other, males displayed courting behaviors. Older and larger males tend to win contests with other males, and therefore gain access to any nearby females. Any contest victories or defeats did not affect a lizard's future location. Larger bodied males are more likely to mate with multiple females. Contests with other males and courtship towards females elevates plasma levels of corticosterone, an indicator of stress, in adult males.

Feeding behaviors

Fence lizards are ambush, sit-and-wait, predators. They are insectivores that typically eat arthropods such as ants and grasshoppers. Studies have shown that eastern fence lizards display an ontogenetic shift in consumption of native and invasive prey. Although eastern fence lizards are an ant specialist, invasive imported red fire ants can pose a risk to young, smaller-bodied juveniles if they consume them, especially because young fence lizards are more common consumers of ants than adults. Experimentally, fence lizard prefer to eat the native ants. Ants compose up to 80% of a juvenile's diet. It was found there was an increased consumption of fire adults in the adult life stage compared to earlier life stages. These lizards are known to forage generally twice a day. Females will eat more during the breeding season for greater energy storage to help produce offspring.

=== Reproduction and life cycle ===
The female finds a suitable location to lay her eggs, usually in a rotting log or similarly damp area, and deposits them without any further parental care. Young females will only produce one clutch of three to sixteen eggs, while a large female can produce up to four. The eggs take approximately ten weeks to hatch and emerge near the end of summer. The young lizards grow quickly and are able to reproduce the next year.

Unfavorable nesting conditions can cause females to retain their eggs longer than they would have otherwise. This phenomenon is referred to as egg retention. Egg retention in the eastern fence lizard produces heavier eggs with more advanced embryos and with higher posthatching survival rate, but does not influence phenotype.. The average egg size is 0.23-0.42 g.

Greater reproductive energy allocated to first clutches is common at higher latitudes, whereas more energy is dedicated to later clutches in lower latitudes.

==== Embryonic development ====
After the eggs are laid by a female, the development of the embryo and yolk within differ from that of birds, which has long been assumed to be identical. Instead, the process is more similar to snakes.

Strands form a vascularized network within the yolk sac cavity. The embryo and yolk sac cavity then progress through three distinct developmental stages.

In the first stage, endodermal cells develop and invade the nourishing yolk in order to digest it. They may clump within and begin filling the cavity.

In the second stage, the vasculature of the yolk sac produces blood vessels that expand throughout the cavity.

In the third stage, the cells organize themselves around the blood vessels. They can now more quickly and easily digest yolk. The products of digestion reach the embryo via release into blood vessels.

=== Escape response to fire ants ===
The pressures of predation can select for a variety of escape tactics. In their natural habitat, these lizards encounter invasive ants, red imported fire ants (Solenopsis invicta), the bites of which threaten the lizards with envenomation and, possibly, reduced growth in juveniles. Fire ants also compete with eastern fence lizards for their nesting habitats and predate on their eggs. These encounters can be dangerous and even lethal to the lizards. When attacked by these stinging fire ants, fence lizards twitch their bodies to throw off the attacking ants before fleeing. The learning of these lizards after repeated exposure to fire ants has also been studied. Lizards that were more familiar or exposed to attacking fire ants tend to twitch more and flee sooner compared to lizards that were not exposed. This may also be an adaptive behavioral response induced by higher stress levels (and thus, elevated corticosteroids). However, exposure to fire ants did not increase the percentage of lizards that demonstrated escape behavior. Instead, those that had priorly shown escape behavior were more likely to show escape behavior earlier and more strongly. In other words, this behavior is not learned, but can be shaped if already present. The number of twitches performed by a lizard is also not affected by previous exposure. Juveniles, which are younger and smaller, flee more rapidly than adults in any encounter. Furthermore, within the past 70 years, according to a study published in 2009, eastern fence lizards in certain regions have adapted to have longer legs and new behaviors to escape the red imported fire ant, which can kill the lizard in under a minute.

Given the incubation period of the eggs, one study suggests that 61% of nests may be at risk of predation by these invasive fire ants. Nest choice and distance to the nearest fire ant mound did not significantly impact predation; thus, because there is little that eastern fence lizards can do to resist such predation on their eggs, there is conservation efforts toward stopping invasive species such as this fire ant.

== Gallery ==
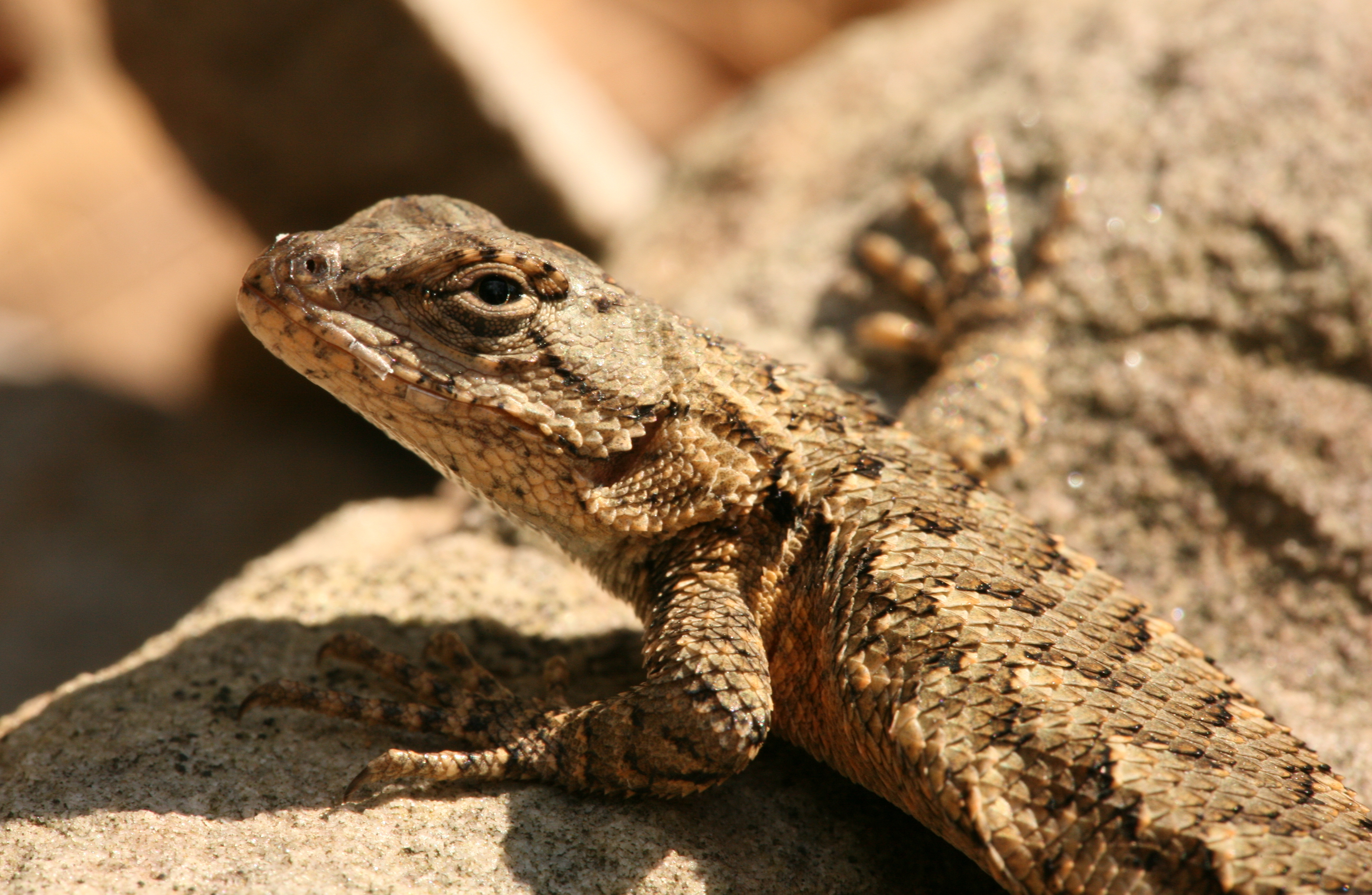
Eastern fence lizard at the Shawnee National Forest

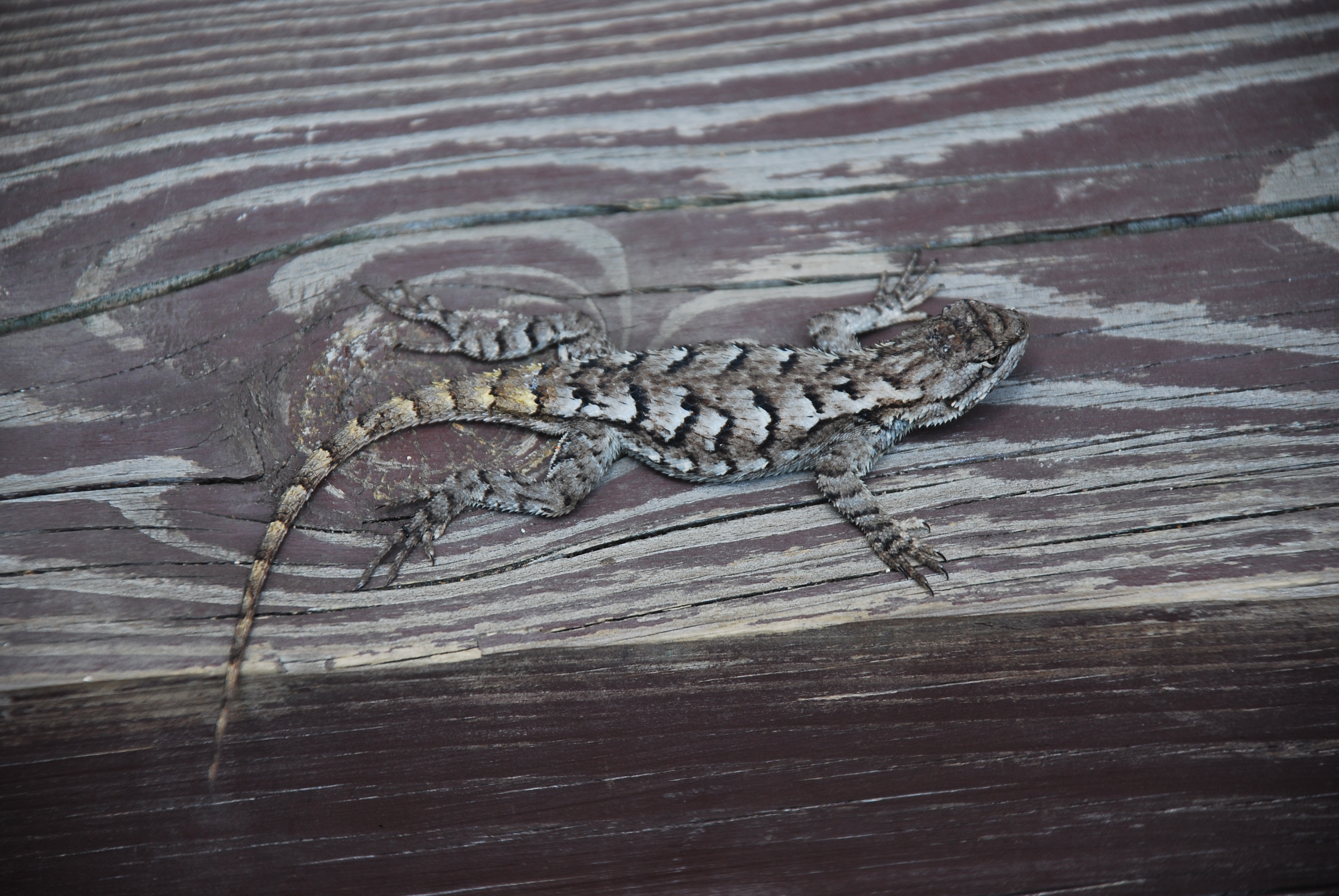
Lizard at Douthat State Park camouflaging on wood

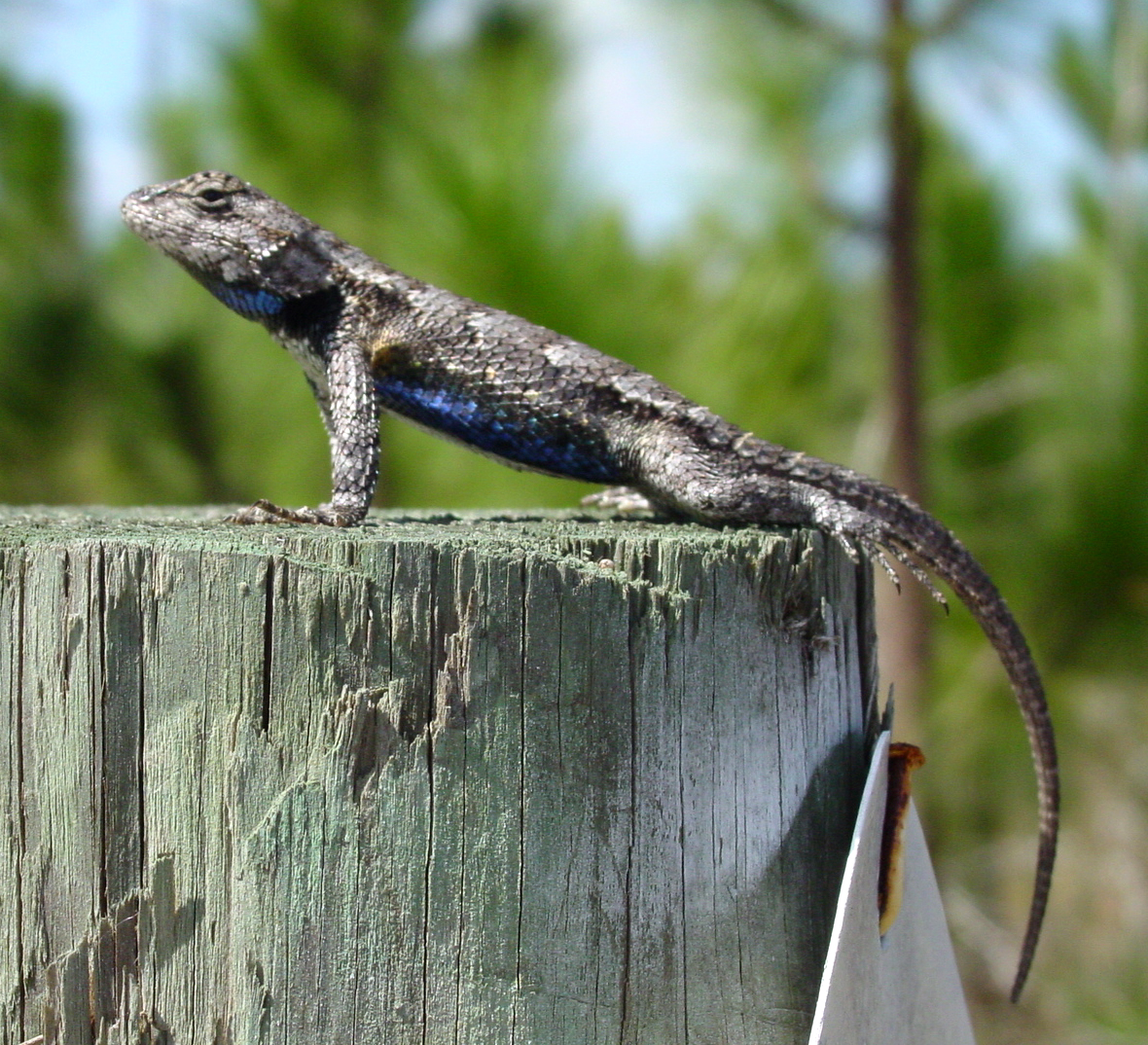
On a fence post

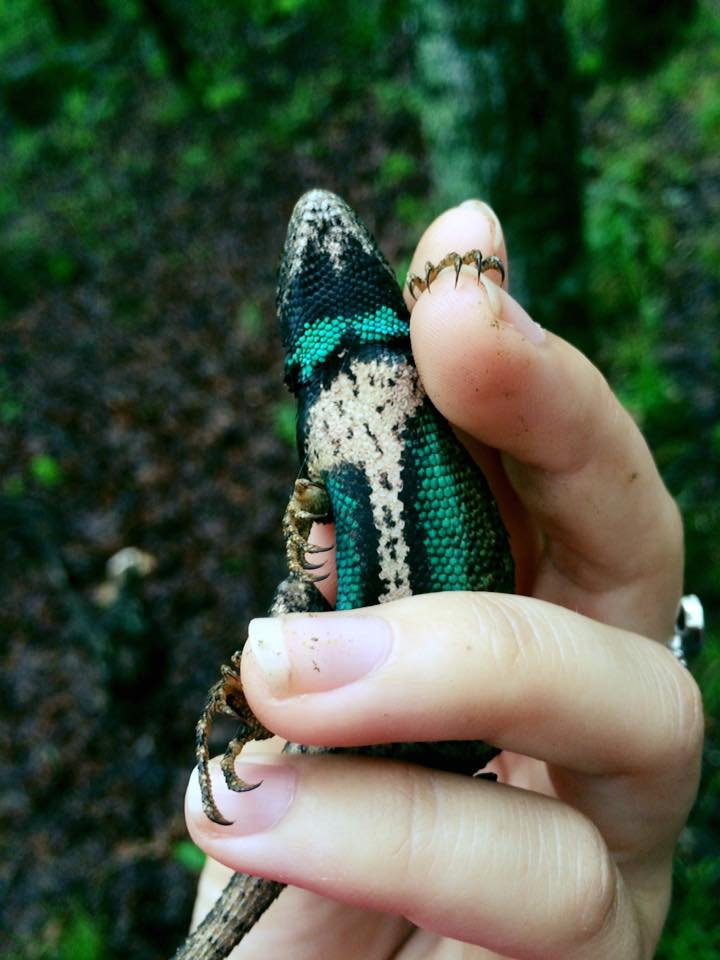
Underside of a male showing the turquoise markings

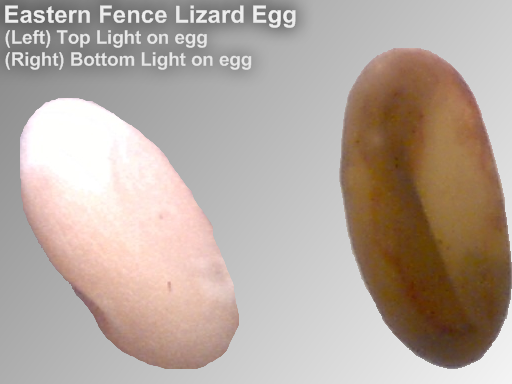
Eastern fence lizard eggs
