= Post oak-blackjack oak barrens =

The post oak-blackjack oak barrens is an extremely small and restricted ecoregion only found on Staten Island. It is part of the North Atlantic Coast ecoregion and is characterized by its abundance of blackjack oak (Quercus marilandica) and post oak (Quercus stellata). The top soil layer is sandy and dry, causing there to be little to no grass and stunted woody growth. Like other pine barrens ecosystems, this habitat is prone to wildfires.

It is in severe decline due to human expansion and one of the few places that it is left in is the Clay Pit Ponds State Park Preserve.

== Plant species ==
The dry sandy soil along with wildfires and exposure to sea spray make this ecoregion a very harsh habitat for plants. All the plants found here have to be adapted to handling dry conditions by preserving water and growing slowly.

- Post oak (Quercus stellata)
- Scarlet oak (Quercus coccinea)
- Blackjack oak (Quercus marilandica)
- White oak (Quercus alba)
- Black oak (Quercus velutina)
- Sassafras (Sassafras albidum)
- American chestnut (Castanea dentata)
- Gray birch (Betula populifolia)
- Red maple (Acer rubrum)
- Pitch pine (Pinus rigida)
- Black gum (Nyssa sylvatica)
- Blueberries (Vaccinium corymbosum and Vaccinium pallidum)
- Black huckleberry (Gaylussacia baccata)
- Carrion flower (Smilax herbacea)
- Greenbrier (Smilax glauca)
- Old field toadflax (Nuttallanthus canadensis)
- Bracken fern (Pteridium aquilinum)
- Bastard toadflax (Comandra umbellata)
- Switch grass (Panicum virgatum)
- Little bluestem (Schizachyrium scoparium)
- Gray goldenrod (Solidago nemoralis)
- Wild indigo (Baptisia tinctoria)

== Animal species ==
This ecoregion is known to be inhabited by an introduced population of eastern fence lizards (Sceloporus undulatus). A group of 29 of these lizards were transplanted from the New Jersey Pine Barrens in South Jersey by Carl Kauffeld in 1942.
