= B. tinctoria =

B. tinctoria may refer to:

- Baptisia tinctoria, a plant species
- Bergeris tinctoria, a plant species in the genus Bergeris found in Mukurthi National Park, Tamil Nadu, India
- Broussonitia tinctoria, a plant species in the genus Broussonitia

== See also ==
- Tinctoria
