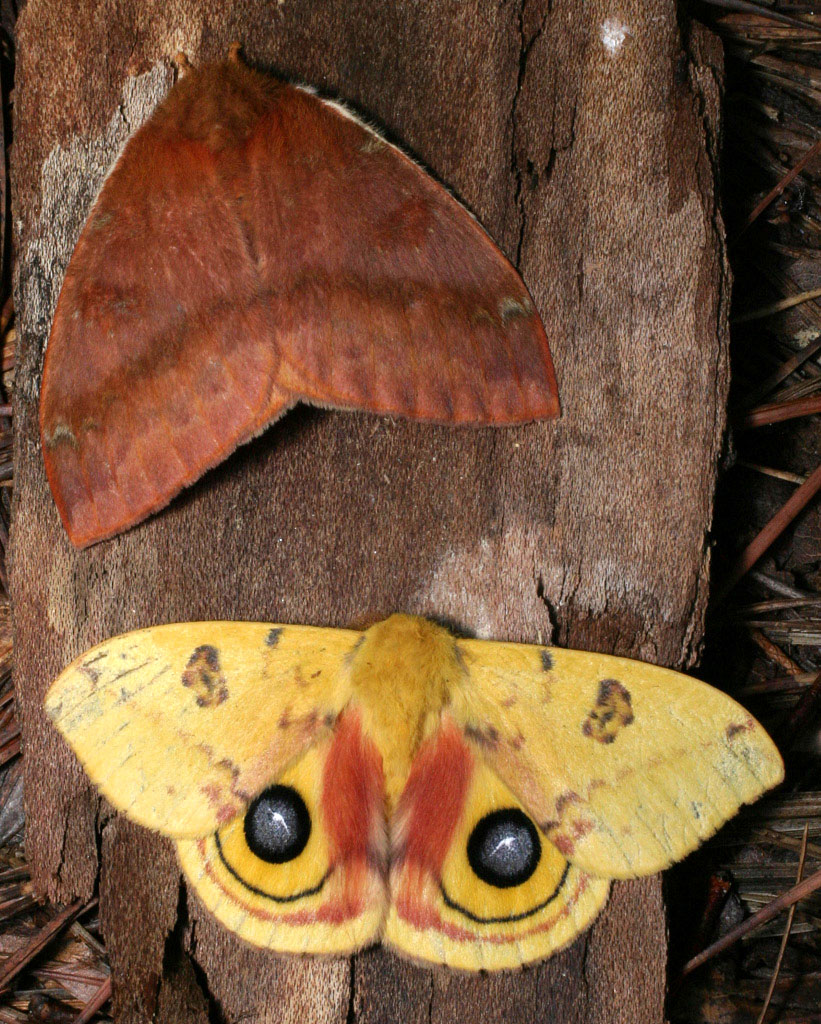
- Female (top) and male (below)

Conservation status
- Secure (NatureServe)

Scientific classification
- Kingdom: Animalia
- Phylum: Arthropoda
- Clade: Pancrustacea
- Class: Insecta
- Order: Lepidoptera
- Family: Saturniidae
- Genus: Automeris
- Species: A. io

Binomial name
- Automeris io (Fabricius, 1775)

Subspecies
- Automeris io io (Fabricius, 1775); Automeris io neomexicana Barnes & Benjamin, 1923

Synonyms
- Bombyx io Fabricius, 1775; Phalaena io (Fabricius, 1775); Hyperchiria io (Fabricius, 1775); Hyperchiria lilith Strecker, 1872

= Automeris io =

Io moth

Species of moth

Automeris io, the Io moth (EYE-oh) or peacock moth, is a colorful North American moth in the family Saturniidae. The Io moth is also a member of the subfamily Hemileucinae. The name Io comes from Greek mythology in which Io was a mortal lover of Zeus. The Io moth ranges from the southeast corner of Manitoba and in the southern extremes of Ontario, Quebec, New Brunswick and Nova Scotia in Canada, and in the US it is found from Montana, North Dakota, South Dakota, Nebraska, Colorado, New Mexico, Texas, Utah, east of those states and down to the southern end of Florida. The species was first described by Johan Christian Fabricius in 1775.

== Adult description ==
Imagines (sexually mature, reproductive stage) have a wingspan of 2.5–3.5 inches (63–88 mm). This species is sexually dimorphic: males have bright yellow forewings, body, and legs, while females have reddish-brown to purple forewings, body, and legs. The males also have much bigger plumose (feathery) antennae than the females. Both males and females have one big black to bluish eyespot with some white in the center, on each hindwing. Some hybridizations have resulted in variations in these hindwing eyespots. Adults live 1–2 weeks.

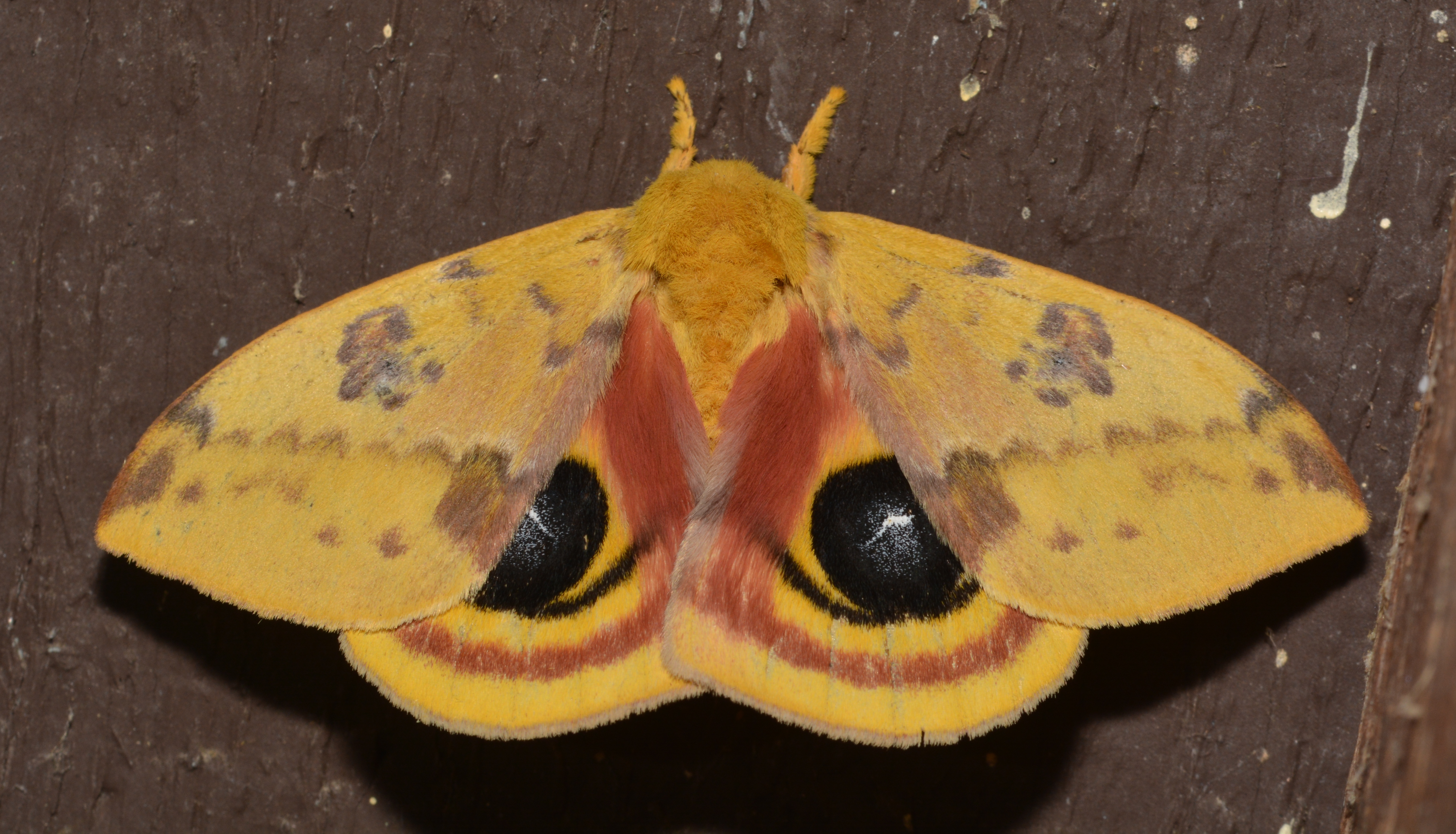
Male

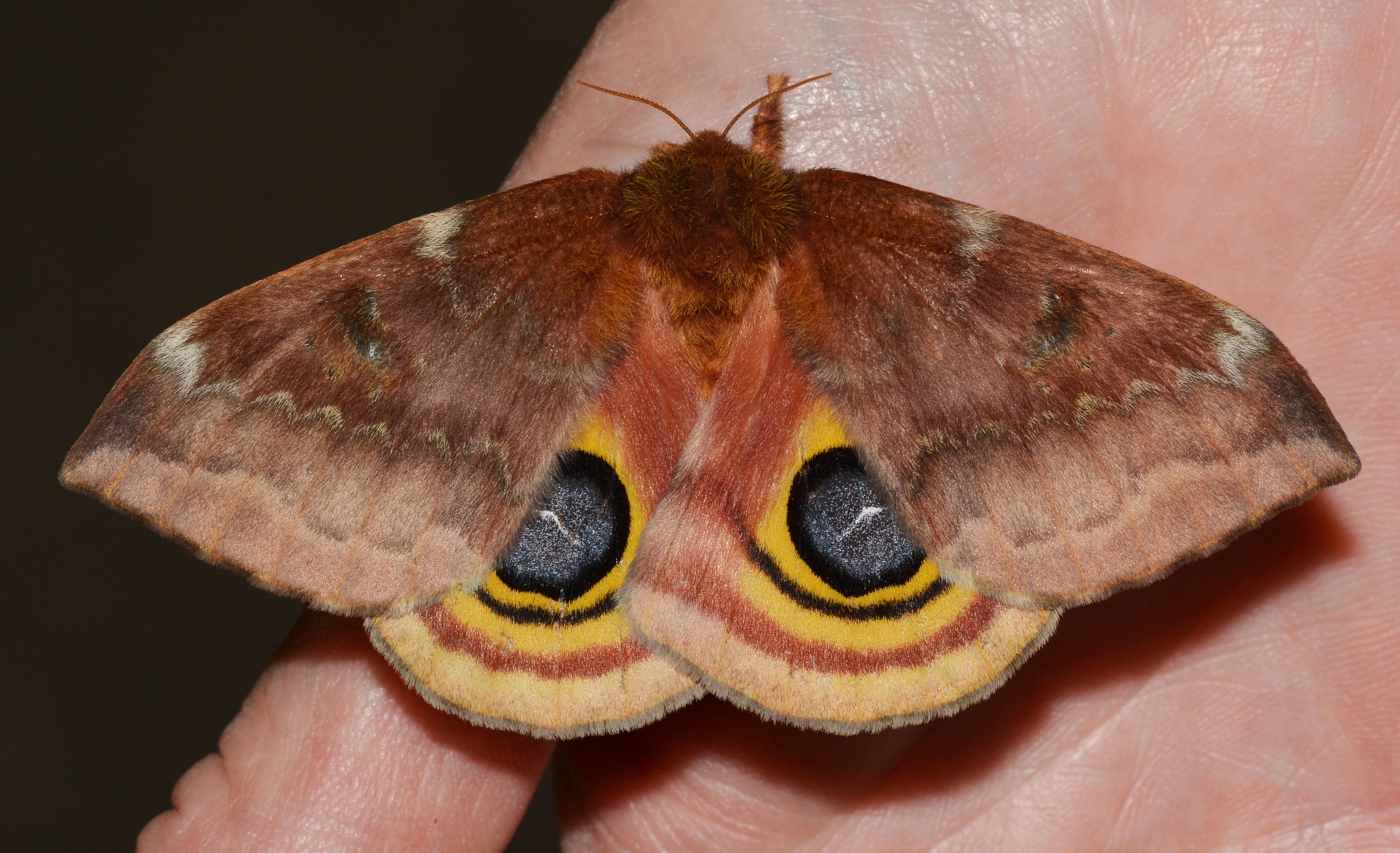
Female

== Predators ==
Io moths have many predators. These include bats, birds, small mammals, and spiders.

=== Parasitoids ===
Many species of flies (Tachinidae) and wasps (Ichneumonidae and Braconidae) are known parasitoids. The flies include the introduced Compsilura concinnata, Lespesia sabroskyi, Chetogena claripennis, Carcelia formosa, Sisyropa eudryae, Lespesia frenchii, and Nilea dimmocki. The wasps include the Ichneumonidae species Hyposoter fugitivus and Enicospilus americanus, and the Braconidae species Cotesia electrae and Cotesia hemileucae.

== Defenses ==
Stinging spines of caterpillar Io moths have a very painful venom that is released with the slightest touch. There are two hypotheses regarding where this venom originates: (1) the glandular cells on the base of the branched setae or (2) from the secretory epithelial cells. Contacting the seta is not life-threatening for humans, but still causes irritation to the dermal tissue, resulting in an acute dermatitis called erucism. Both male and female adult Io moths utilize their hindwing eyespots in predatory defense when the moth is sitting in the head-down position or is touched, via shaking and exposing these eyespots.

== Lifecycle ==
The eggs have large micropyle rosettes that turn black as the fertile eggs develop. They are usually laid in clusters of more than twenty and hatch within 8–11 days. From the eggs, orange larvae emerge, usually eating their egg shell soon after hatching. They go through five instars, each one being a little different.

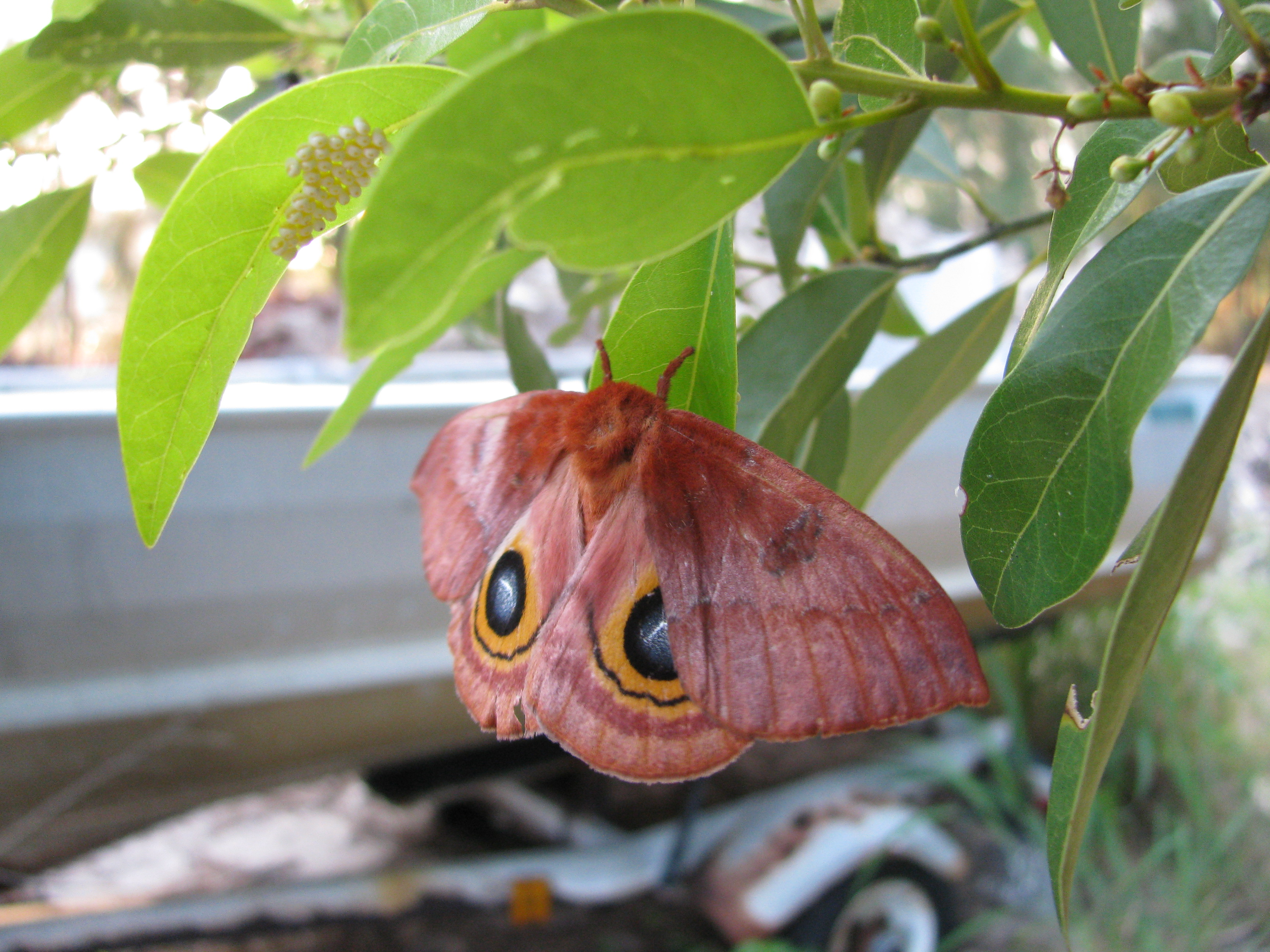
Female Io moth after laying eggs

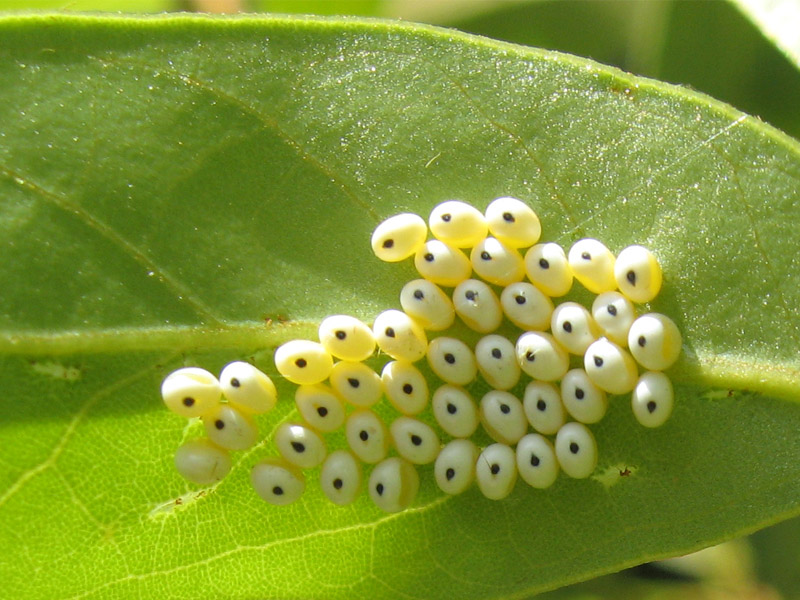
Eggs, about 48 hours after being laid, on a bay tree leaf

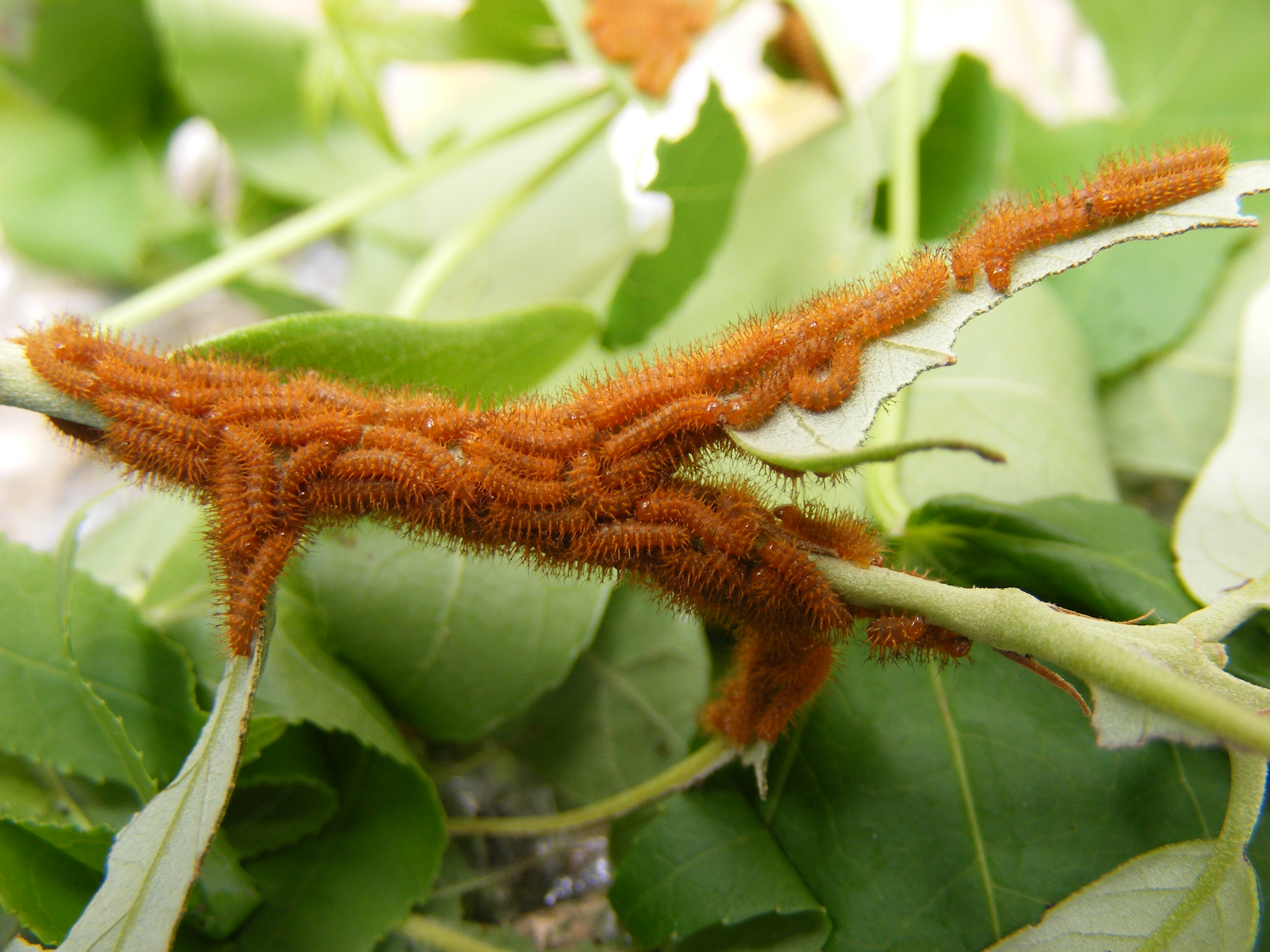
First instar on Quercus virginiana

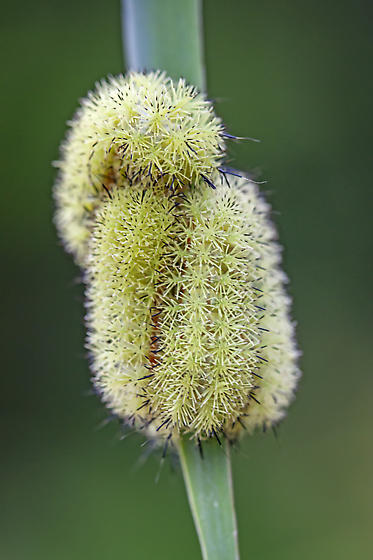
Caterpillars on reed

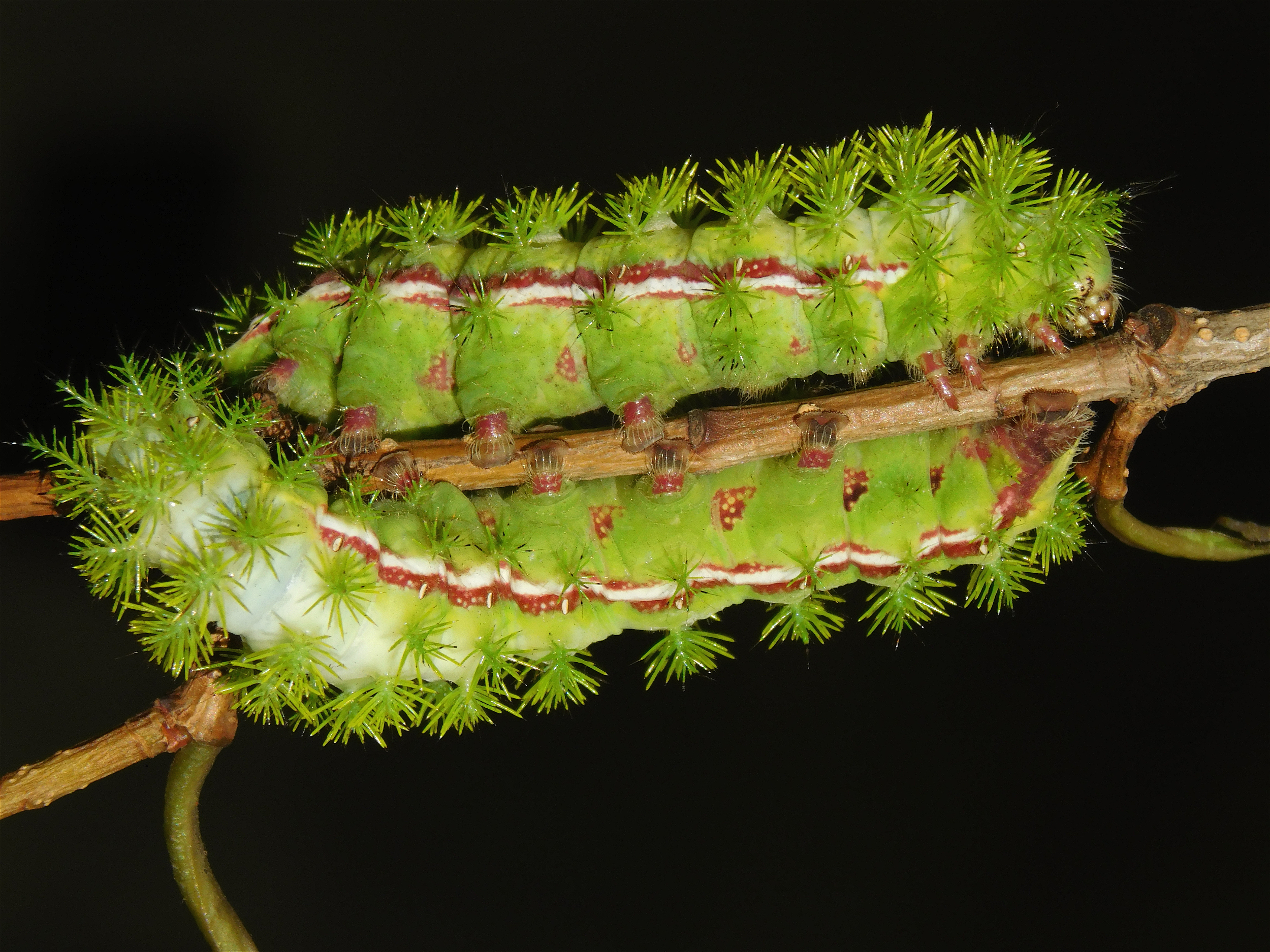
Final instar

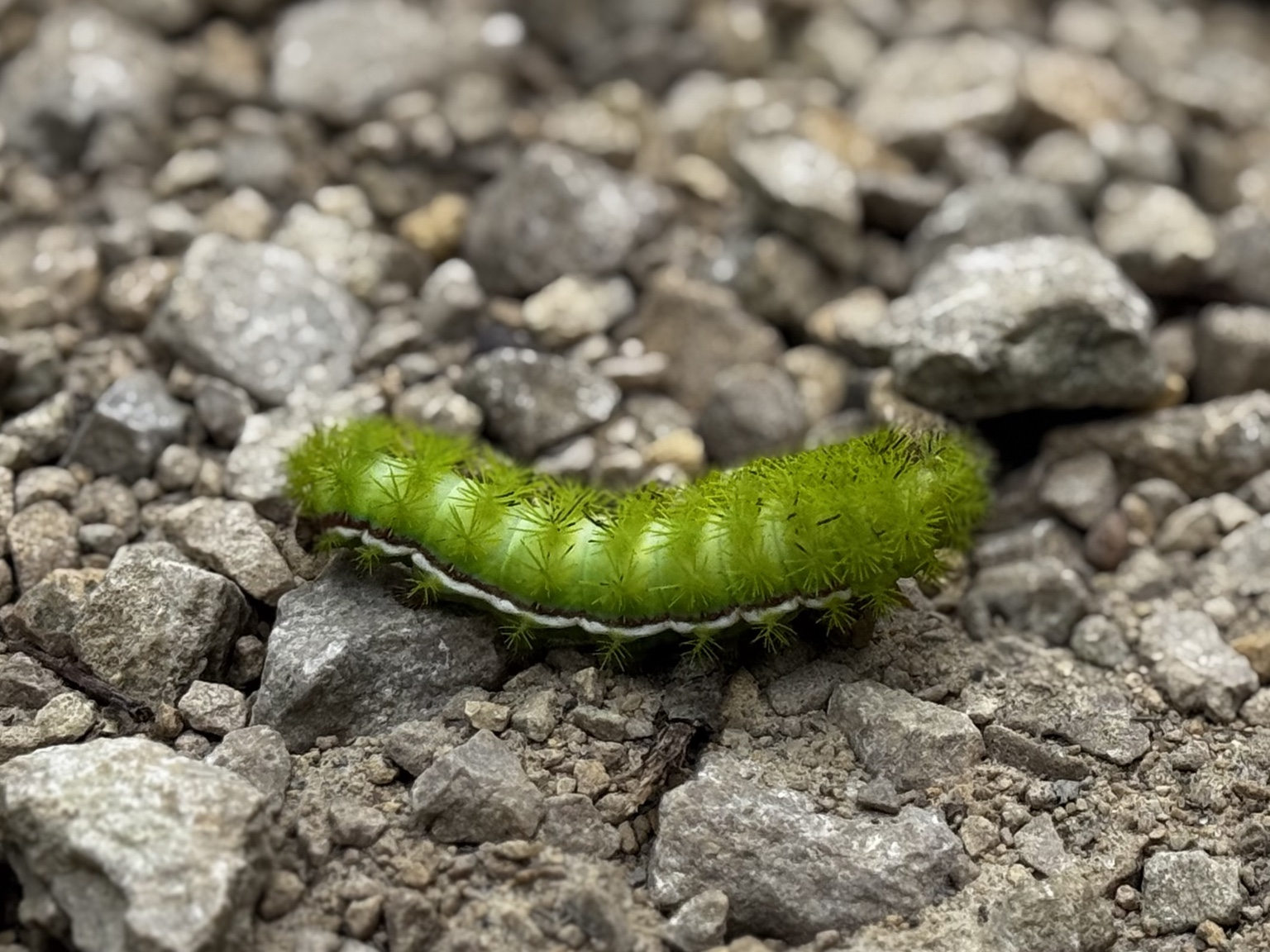
Automeris io caterpillar crawling on rocks.

The caterpillars are herbivorous and gregarious in all their instars, and may be seen traveling in single-file processions over the food plant when young. In certain regions of the country, larvae may have preferred hosts out of the long list that this species can accept elsewhere. As the larvae develop, they will lose their orange color and will turn bright green and urticating, having many spines. The green caterpillars have two lateral stripes, the upper one being bright red and the lower one being white. These caterpillars can reach sizes of 7 cm in length. When the caterpillars are ready, they spin a flimsy, valveless cocoon made from a dark, coarse silk. Some larvae will crawl to the base of the tree and make their cocoons among leaf litter on the ground, while others will use living leaves to wrap their cocoons with. The leaves will turn brown and fall to the ground during fall, taking the cocoons with them. There they pupate, the pupa being dark brown/black. The pupae also have sexual dimorphism with the females' possessing a notch on their posterior ventral aspect, while the males' pupae bear a pair of tubercles near that area with no notch.

Adult Io moths normally emerge from their cocoons in late morning or early afternoon. The emergence of the adult moths is typically from June to July. Eclosion (emergence from the cocoon) only takes a few minutes. After eclosing, the moths climb and hang on plants so that their furled wings can be inflated with fluid (hemolymph) pumped from the body. This inflation process takes about twenty minutes. Adult moths are strictly nocturnal, generally flying during the peak hours of the night. The females generally wait until nightfall and then extend a scent gland from the posterior region of the abdomen, in order to attract males via wind-borne pheromones. The males use their larger antennae to detect the pheromones. After mating, the females die following egg laying. These moths have vestigial mouthparts and do not eat in the adult stage.

== Host plants ==
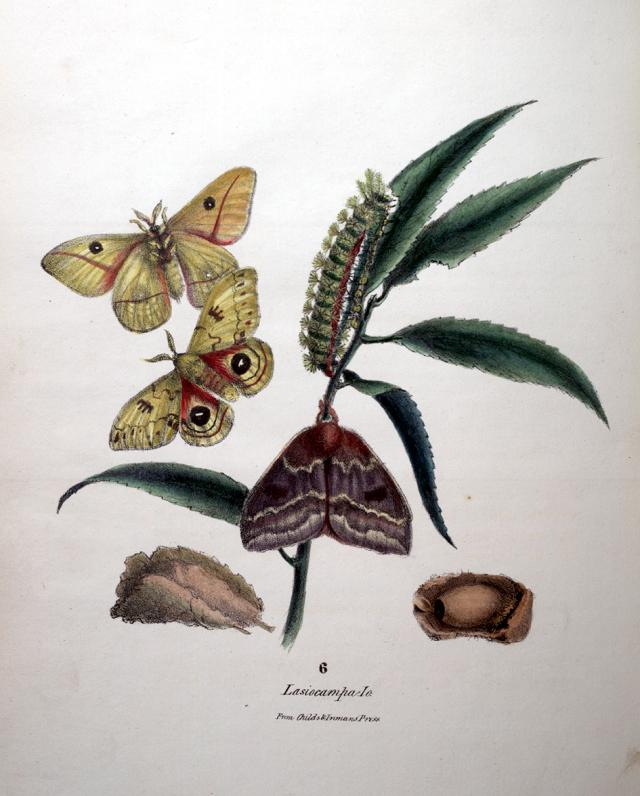
Automeris io by Titian Peale, 1833

Females lay small, white ova in the leaves of many host plants, including:

- Morus alba—mulberry
- Prunus pensylvanica—pin cherry
- Salix—willow
- Abies balsamea—balsam fir
- Acer rubrum—red maple
- Amorpha fruticosa—bastard indigo
- Baptisia tinctoria—wild indigo
- Carpinus caroliniana—American hornbeam
- Celtis laevigata—sugarberry or southern hackberry
- Cephalanthus occidentalis—button-bush
- Cercis canadensis—eastern redbud
- Chamaecrista fasciculata—showy partridge pea
- Comptonia peregrina—sweetfern
- Cornus florida—flowering dogwood
- Corylus avellana—common hazel
- Erythrina herbacea—coral bean
- Fagus—beech
- Fraxinus—ash
- Liquidambar styraciflua—American sweetgum
- Lythrum salicaria—introduced purple loosestrife
- Quercus—oak
- Paeonia—peony
- Phoenix roebelenii

== Conservation status ==
The Io moth has not been evaluated for listing on the IUCN Red List and has no special status on the U.S. Federal List. In the eastern range of the US, the populations indicate a declining and more localized trend.

== See also ==
- Aglais io, a butterfly species
