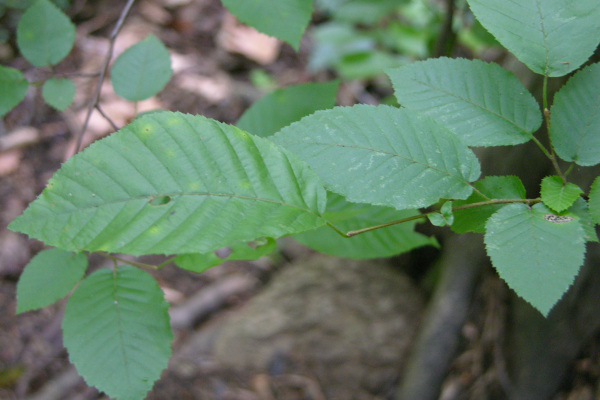

Conservation status
- Least Concern (IUCN 3.1)

Scientific classification
- Kingdom: Plantae
- Clade: Embryophytes
- Clade: Tracheophytes
- Clade: Angiosperms
- Clade: Eudicots
- Clade: Rosids
- Order: Fagales
- Family: Betulaceae
- Genus: Carpinus
- Species: C. caroliniana

Binomial name
- Carpinus caroliniana Walter

Subspecies
- Carpinus caroliniana subsp. caroliniana; Carpinus caroliniana subsp. virginiana (Marshall) Furlow
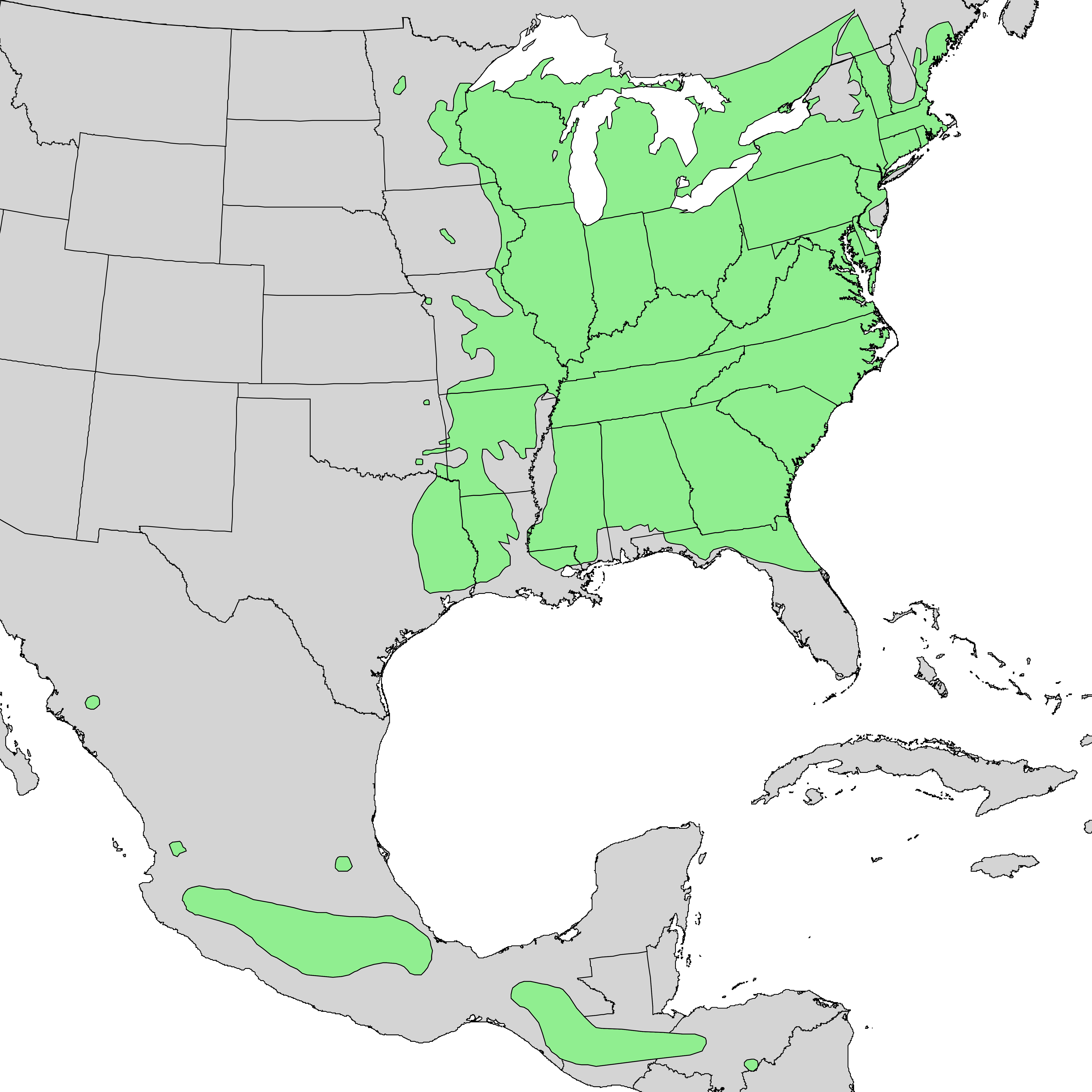
- Natural range of C. caroliniana

Synonyms
- synonyms of subsp. caroliniana: Carpinus americanus Michx.; Carpinus ostryoides Raf.; synonyms of subsp. virginiana: Carpinus betulus var. virginiana Marshall; Carpinus caroliniana var. virginiana (Marshall) Fernald

= Carpinus caroliniana =

Species of tree

Carpinus caroliniana, the American hornbeam, is a small hardwood understory tree in the genus Carpinus. American hornbeam is also known as blue-beech, ironwood, musclewood and muscle beech for the distinctive sinewy, muscle-like appearance of its trunk. It is native to eastern North America, from Minnesota to southern Quebec, east to Maine, and south to eastern Texas and northern Florida. It occurs in shaded areas with moist soil, particularly near the banks of streams or rivers, and is often a natural understory species of the riverine and maritime forests of eastern temperate North America.

== Description ==
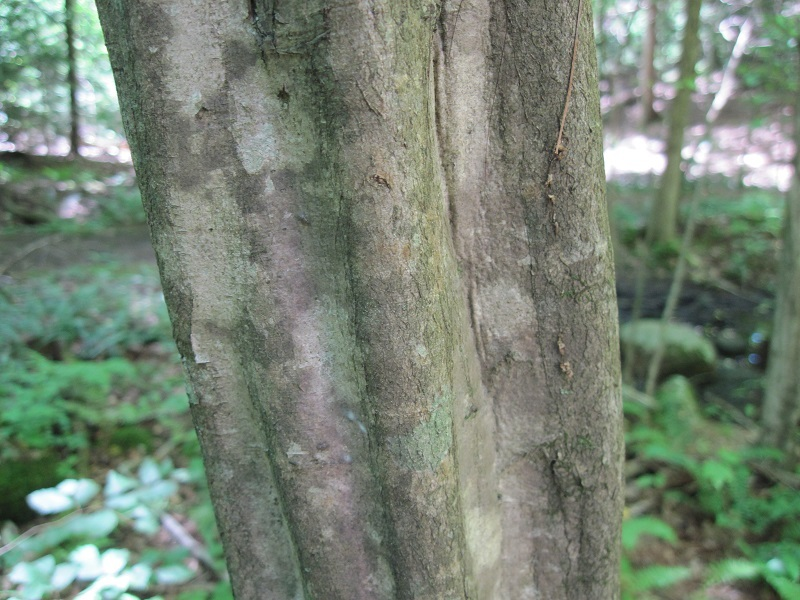
Bark

Carpinus caroliniana (American hornbeam) is a small tree reaching heights of 6–10 meters (20–35 ft), and often has a fluted and crooked trunk. The bark is smooth and greenish-grey, becoming shallowly fissured in all old trees. The leaves are alternate, 3–12 centimeters (1 1/4–4 3/4 in) long, with prominent veins giving a distinctive corrugated texture, and a serrated margin. The male and female catkins appear in spring at the same time as the leaves. The fruit is a small 7–8-millimeter (9/32–5/16-inch) long nut, partially surrounded by a three- to seven-pointed leafy involucre 2–3 centimeters (3/4–1 1/4 in) long; it matures in autumn. The seeds often do not germinate till the spring of the second year after maturating.

- Bark: On old trees near the base, furrowed. Young trees and branches smooth, dark bluish gray, sometimes furrowed, light and dark gray. Branchlets at first pale green, changing to reddish brown, ultimately dull gray.
- Wood: Light brown, sapwood nearly white; heavy, hard, close-grained, very strong. Specific gravity, 0.7286; density 45.41 pounds per cubic foot (0.7274 g/cm^{3}).
- Winter buds: Ovate, acute, chestnut brown, 1/8 inch (3 mm) long. Inner scales enlarge when spring growth begins. No terminal bud is formed.
- Leaves: Alternate, two to four inches long, ovate-oblong, rounded, wedge-shaped, or rarely subcordate and often unequal at base, sharply and doubly serrate, acute or acuminate. They come out of the bud pale bronze green and hairy; when full grown they are dull deep green above, paler beneath; feather-veined, midrib and veins very prominent on under side. In autumn bright red, deep scarlet and orange. Petioles short, slender, hairy. Stipules caducous.
- Flowers: April. Monoecious, without petals, the staminate spike naked in pendulous catkins (aments). The staminate ament buds are axillary and form in the autumn. During the winter they resemble leaf-buds, only twice as large. They begin to lengthen very early in the spring, and when full grown are about 1 1/2 inches (4 cm) long. The staminate flower is composed of three to twenty stamens crowded on a hairy torus, adnate to the base of a broadly ovate, acute boot-shaped scale, green below the middle, bright red at apex. The pistillate aments are one-half to three-fourths of an inch long with ovate, acute, hairy, green scales and bright scarlet styles.
- Fruit: Clusters of involucres, hanging from the ends of leafy branches. Each involucre slightly encloses a small oval nut. The involucres are short stalked, usually three-lobed, though one lobe is often wanting; halberd-shaped, coarsely serrated on one margin, or entire.

== Subdivisions ==
There are two subspecies, which intergrade extensively where they meet:

- Carpinus caroliniana subsp. caroliniana. Atlantic coastal plain north to Delaware, and lower Mississippi Valley west to eastern Texas. Leaves mostly smaller, 3–9 cm (1 1/4–3 1/2 in) long, and relatively broader, 3–6 cm (1 1/4–2 1/4 in) broad.
- Carpinus caroliniana subsp. virginiana. Appalachian Mountains and west to Minnesota and south to Arkansas. Leaves mostly larger, 8–12 cm (3 1/4–4 3/4 in) long, and relatively narrower, 3.5–6 cm (1 3/8–2 3/8 in) broad.

== Ecology ==
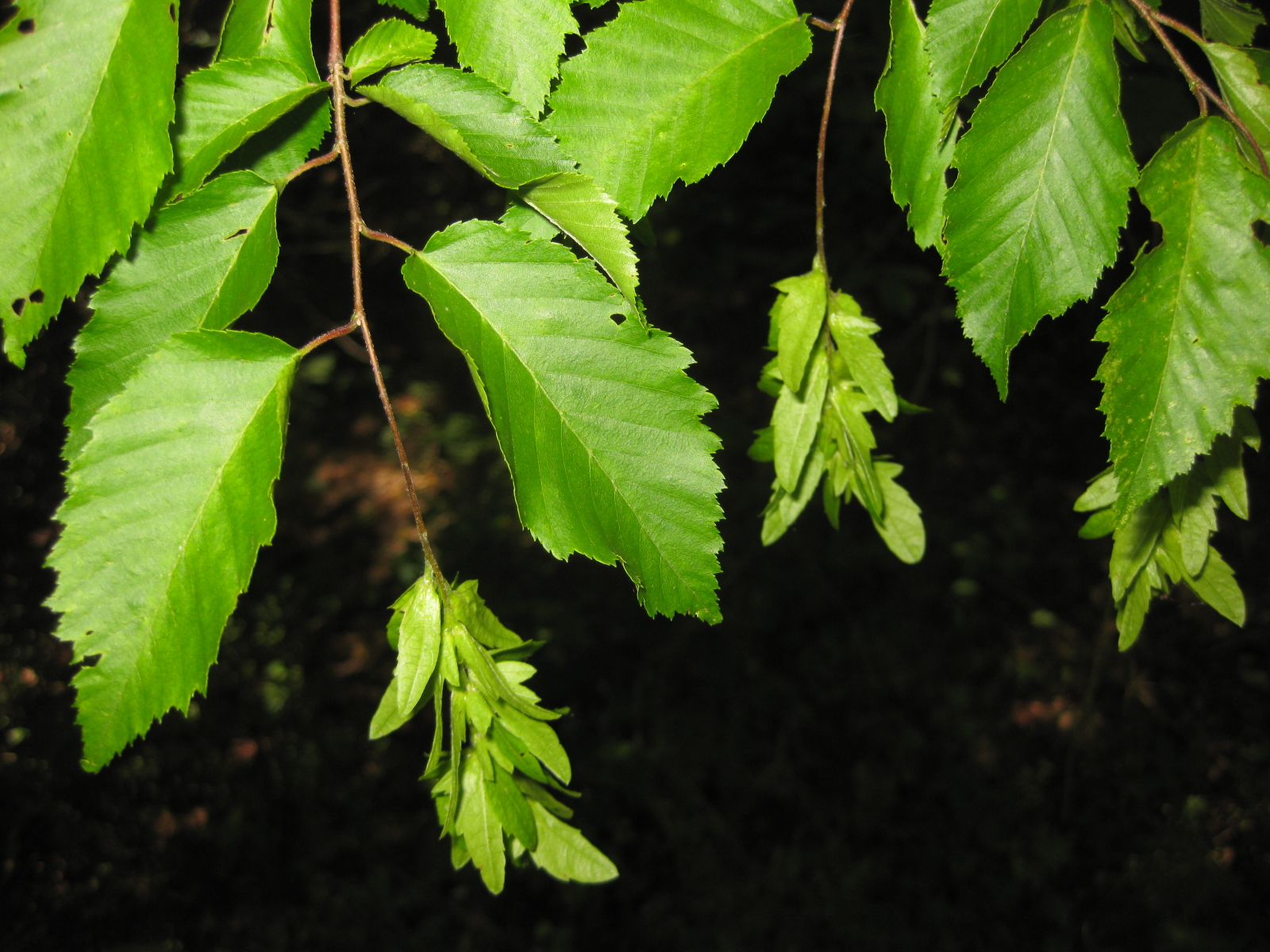
Fruiting branch

They are shade-loving trees, preferring moderate soil fertility and moisture. It has a shallow, wide-spreading root system. The leaves are eaten by the caterpillars of some Lepidoptera, for example the Io moth (Automeris io).

Common along the borders of streams and swamps, loves a deep moist soil. Varies from shrub to small tree, and ranges throughout the United States east of the Rocky Mountains.

Deer browse the foliage and twigs, while game birds eat the nutlets.

== Uses ==
The wood is heavy and hard (Specific gravity, 0.7286; density 45.41 pounds per cubic foot (0.7274 g/cm3)), and is used for tool handles, longbows, levers, walking sticks, walking canes and golf clubs.
