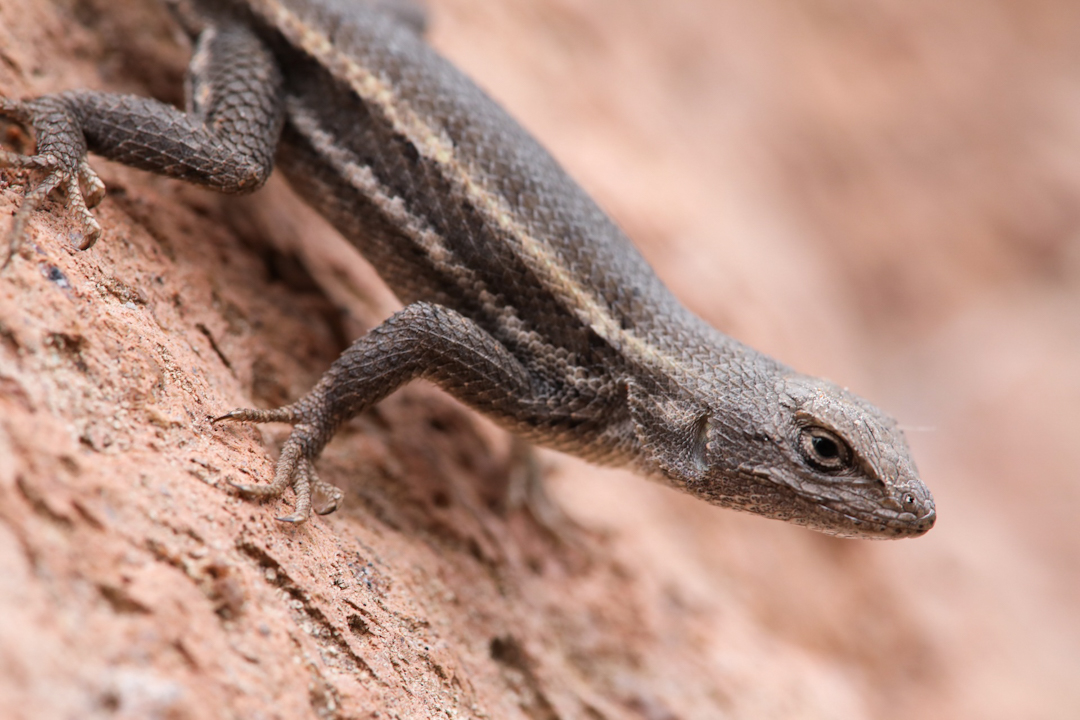

Conservation status
- Least Concern (IUCN 3.1)

Scientific classification
- Kingdom: Animalia
- Phylum: Chordata
- Class: Reptilia
- Order: Squamata
- Suborder: Iguania
- Family: Phrynosomatidae
- Genus: Sceloporus
- Species: S. virgatus

Binomial name
- Sceloporus virgatus H.M. Smith, 1938

= Sceloporus virgatus =

Species of lizard

Sceloporus virgatus, commonly known as the striped plateau lizard, is a species of lizard within the genus Sceloporus. This genus is known for the signaling modalities that it uses and exhibits, including visual motion and chemical signals that aid in identifying their territories as well as color that indicates aggression. The striped plateau lizard originates from the northern Sierra Madre Occidental and is relatively small in size, measuring less than 72 mm (2.8 in) in length.

== Etymology ==
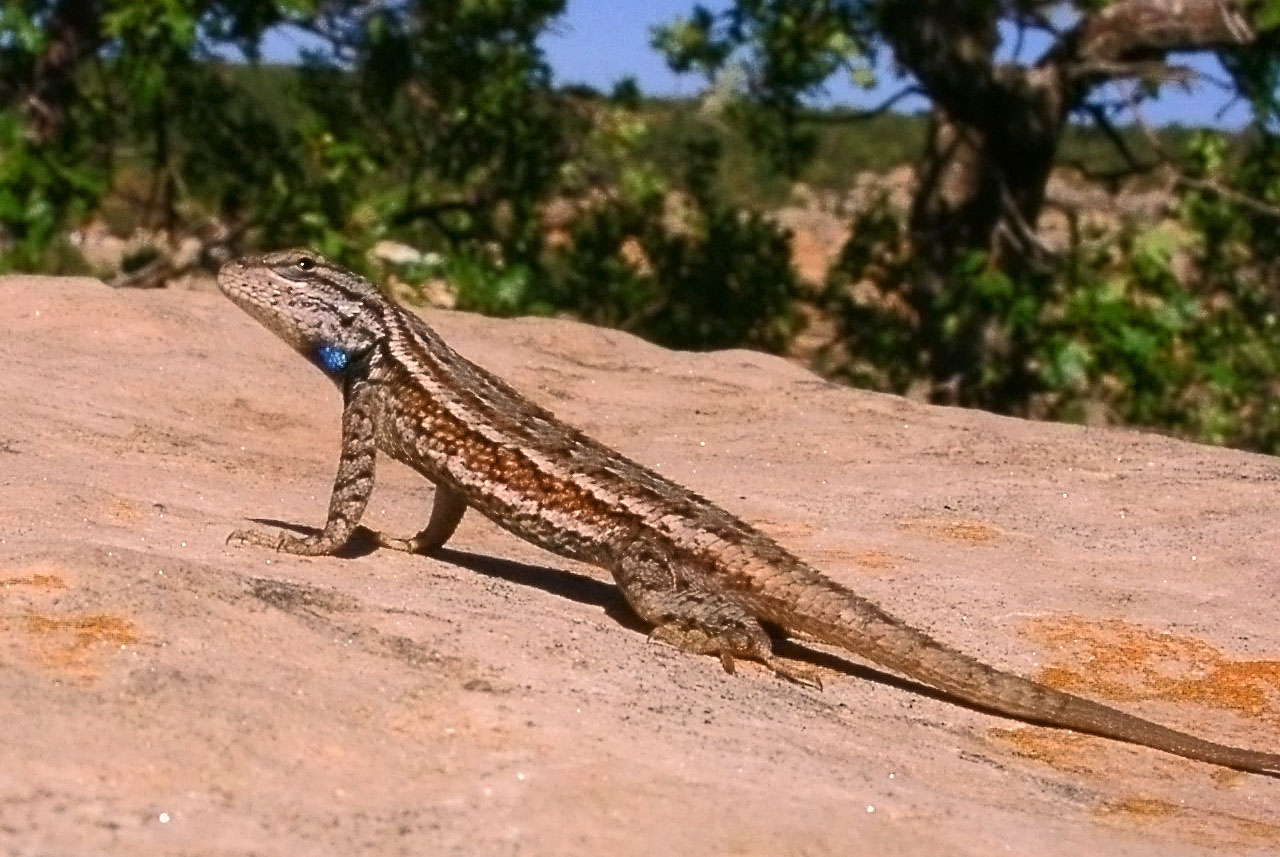
Striped band of Sceloporus virgatus visible as it stands on a rock, basking in the sun.

"Virgatus" is a Latin word, and it signifies "of twigs" and "rodlike". This term represents the distinct, light line with a dark band below it on the dorsal surface of the striped plateau lizard.

== Description ==
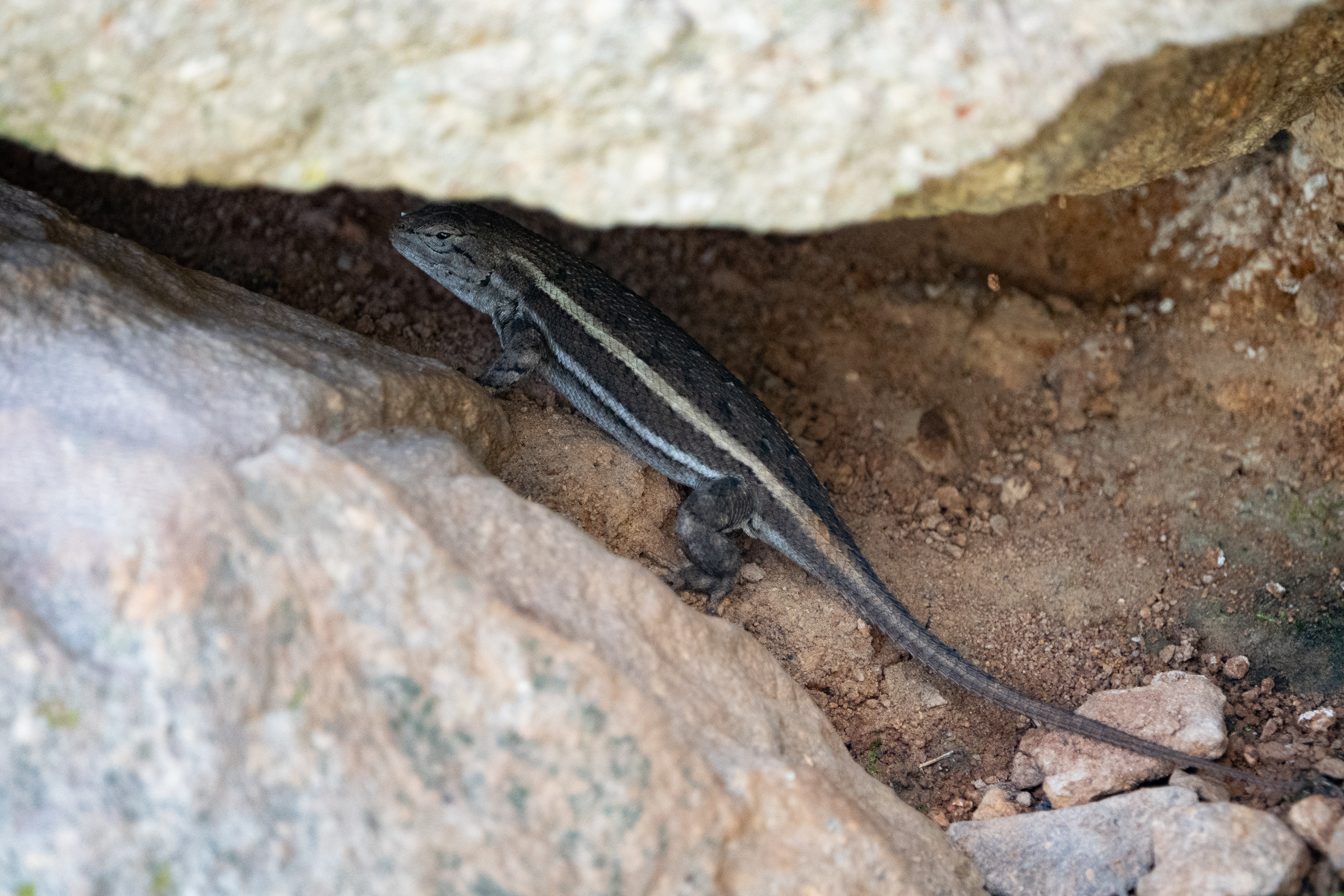
The striped plateau climbing in between rocks with visual of the stripes on its body.

=== Physical body ===
Sceloporus virgatus has an average body mass of 9.35 grams (0.330 oz) and an average body length of 48.2 mm (1.90 in). The striped plateau lizard has a pair of whiteish-yellow stripes on the dorsolateral sides of its body. Hence, the lizard gets its common name from its physical description of stripes, creating the "striped plateau lizard". In females, these stripes tend to appear more as a pale brown. Between the stripes, the body of the striped plateau lizard is colored gray, brown, or tan. This area is also delineated by two vertical rows of lightly shaded spots with dark edges. These spots are slightly difficult to see as they often appear faint and mostly dark in color without white spots in the center. There is another lightly shaded, lateral stripe located low on each side of the lizard, going from the neck to the groin area. The area between the dorsolateral and lateral stripes also tends to be darker than the mid-dorsal area of the body. The ventral underside of the striped plateau lizard, particularly the belly area, is a solid cream in color, with no pattern. However, near the throat, there is a small, faint green or pale blue spot ventrally on the adult lizards.

These animals are sexually dimorphic and there are many differences between males and females. For instance, the colored spots on the throat become bordered with orange or the orange color replaces any faint green or pale blue coloration in reproductive females. The chests of the striped plateau lizards also have a few black spots. Moreover, scales run in rows on the dorsal side of the bodies, in particular, diagonally, upward, and back to the rear side. The lizards also have pores, and for the scales that are located where the pores are, they are notched posteriorly. These scales and pores are most noticeable in male striped plateau lizards. Males are also smaller in size than females, measuring to less than 61 mm (2.4 in) in length. In addition, they have enlarged post-anal scales and swollen tail bases. In comparison to the female striped plateau lizards, the dorsal spotting on males tends to be less distinct, but the striping, the throat patches, and the body color are more vivid and clear.

=== Visual and hearing systems ===
As part of its visual system, the striped plateau lizard has corneal eyes. A curved cornea is an image-forming lens due to the difference in refractive indices between air and corneal tissue. In land vertebrates, many species with corneal eyes also have lenses, but for these species, the lenses are flatter and weaker than those of aquatic species. However, corneal eyes cannot focus in aquatic habitats. Thus, the cornea is the source of most of the refractive power for land vertebrates.

As for the auditory system of the striped plateau lizard, this species has a tympanic middle ear. This is a cavity between the outer ear and the inner ear, and it is filled with air. When auditory vibrations hit the tympanic membrane, or ear drum, sound is processed and heard.

== Habitat and distribution ==
The striped plateau lizard is primarily a terrestrial and montane species since they reside on land, particularly in the temperate forest and in the moist savanna. S. virgatus is most abundantly found in mixed pine and oak woods or in wooded canyons and ravines. It ranges upward into pine forests and downward in oak woodlands located along streams. As the images to the right depict, the striped plateau lizard tends to favor hard and rough surfaces on the ground like rocks, leaf litter, logs, and scattered grasses. They can also be found near sandy, rocky intermittent streams.

Sceloporus virgatus is widely found in Southwestern United States in the geographical range between extreme southeastern Arizona and extreme southwestern New Mexico, including Chiricahua, Peloncillo, Guadalupe, and Animas mountains. This geographical range also extends south to the Sierra Madre Occidental and to southern Chihuahua in Mexico.

With the striped plateau lizard being a montane population, it is isolated geographically by the semi-desert grassland and by the desert-scrub valleys, which are now inhospitable for many other species. More than ten thousand years ago, the desert-scrub valleys were a lot cooler and the woodlands extended down into the valleys, forming a continuous, rather than segregated, habitat for S. virgatus. However, due to the changes in climate and the changes in habitat surroundings, the striped plateau lizard species has become relatively isolated for a very long time.

== Reproduction ==
The striped plateau lizard sexually reproduces and are oviparous animals, indicating that the striped plateau lizard lays eggs and that their offspring hatch from the eggs after coming out of the mothers' bodies. The brood size is 0.291, and the striped plateau lizard produces around one litter per year. When females mature at around 50 mm (2.0 in) in body length, they typically lay a clutch consisting between three and eighteen eggs. This laying of eggs occurs at the beginning of the summer rainy season, which takes place from late June until late July. The size of the clutches are associated with the precipitation and temperature over the past year. Then, hatchlings appear in late August and September, being around 21 to 22 mm (0.83 to 0.87 in) in body length.

The population of S. virgatus is currently stable at around 100,000 individuals, though it is severely fragmented as the number of mature individuals present is continuing to decline. This can lead to an over-abundance of younger striped plateau lizards in the population, which can contribute to slower population growth in the future and be detrimental to the presence of the species as a whole.

== Behavior ==
The striped plateau lizard are diurnal as they are active during the daytime and sleep and remain inactive during the nighttime. This species of lizard seeks shelter and are inactive in cold temperatures and extreme heat.

=== Social interactions ===
Differences between sexes exist when interacting within the species and outside of the species. While both male and female striped plateau lizards defend territories against other individuals of their same sex, the interactions between males tend to be more aggressive. On the other hand, interactions between males and females are ruled by courtship.

=== Signaling modalities ===
Signals are vital to communicating and conveying information well, and Sceloporus lizards combine visual and chemical displays to defend territories and attract mates. In S. virgatus specifically, loss of the color signal is correlated with an increase in chemical behavior but no change in the use of the motion display. Male striped plateau lizards, for instance, use both visual motion with head-bobs, and they use chemical signals to identify their territory and its boundaries. The males use color, specifically the blue patches of color on their bellies, to indicate aggression. This belly color also seems to get more attention from males than from females, which makes sense with the context that it is used in. In particular, as there were more evolutionary changes in the visual motion of head-bobs, there were fewer chemical signals of the large femoral pores associated with the evolutionary changes.

The three signals of motion, color, and chemical cues have evolved differently over time. Firstly, head-bob displays have evolved relatively quickly in response to different selective pressures. For example, arboreality, or the tendency to live in trees, has been shown to affect the evolution of head-bob signals as Sceloporus living in trees seem to produce less jagged head-bob displays than Sceloporus living terrestrially, on land. Thus, lizards that use more head-bobs are also more likely to have evolved an arboreal lifestyle, as well as viviparity. Secondly, the loss of blue belly patches correlates with a lower chance that lizards have evolved arboreality or viviparity. Thirdly, chemical cues are only really associated with arboreality, as arboreal lizards are more likely to have fewer femoral pores.

=== Predator and prey ===
The locomotion of the striped plateau lizard involves running and climbing.

Sceloporus virgatus are invertivores in the sense that they eat insects and other arthropods. Their preferred method of catching prey is via a sudden ambush technique. As these lizards are rather sedentary, this is also called a sit-and-wait method, in which S. virgatus sits and waits for a prey to come up and then ambushes the prey.

== Conservation ==
The striped plateau lizard is present in some regions that are protected. Yet, no direct conservation actions are needed for this particular species. Fortunately, as per the IUCN Red List, S. virgatus is listed as "least concern". Something to watch out for is their isolation pockets, as it might pose a threat to genetic diversity in the population.
