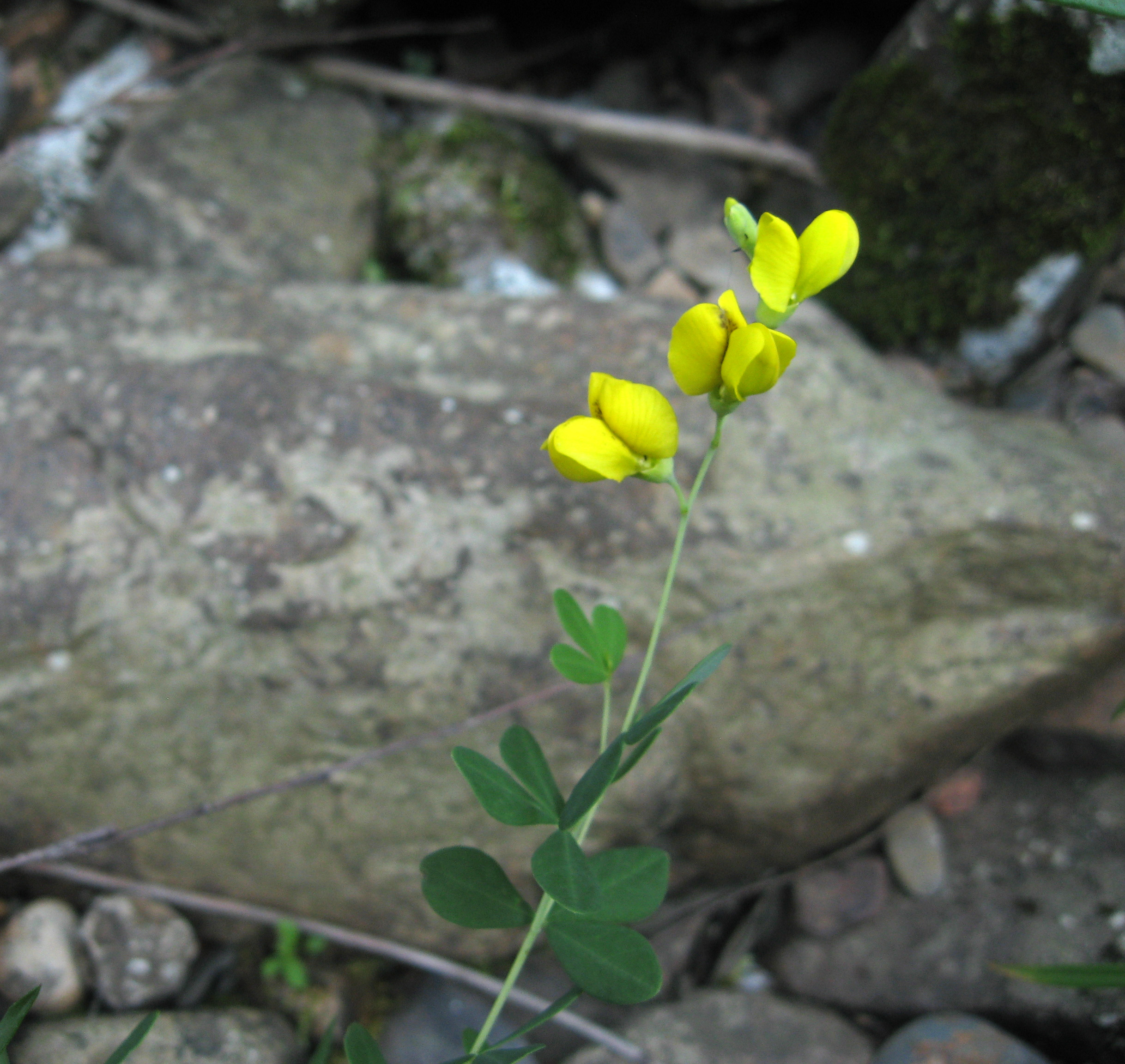

Conservation status
- Secure (NatureServe)

Scientific classification
- Kingdom: Plantae
- Clade: Tracheophytes
- Clade: Angiosperms
- Clade: Eudicots
- Clade: Rosids
- Order: Fabales
- Family: Fabaceae
- Subfamily: Faboideae
- Genus: Baptisia
- Species: B. tinctoria

Binomial name
- Baptisia tinctoria (L.) R.Br. ex Ait.f. (Note: Not validly published by Ventenat, 1808 when erecting genus Baptisia)

Synonyms
- Baptisia tinctoria var. crebra Fernald; Baptisia tinctoria var. projecta Fernald; Baptisia gibbesii Small; Sophora tinctoria Linnaeus

= Baptisia tinctoria =

Species of flowering plant

Baptisia tinctoria (common names include yellow false indigo, wild indigo, wild-indigo and horseflyweed) is a herbaceous perennial plant in the family Fabaceae. It is native to eastern North America.

== Distribution and habitat ==
Baptisia tinctoria is found throughout the eastern United States, west to Minnesota, and south to Florida. As it is rare in some parts of its range, it is protected by some state authorities: in Kentucky it is threatened; in Maine it is considered endangered. It prefers dry meadow and open woodland environments.

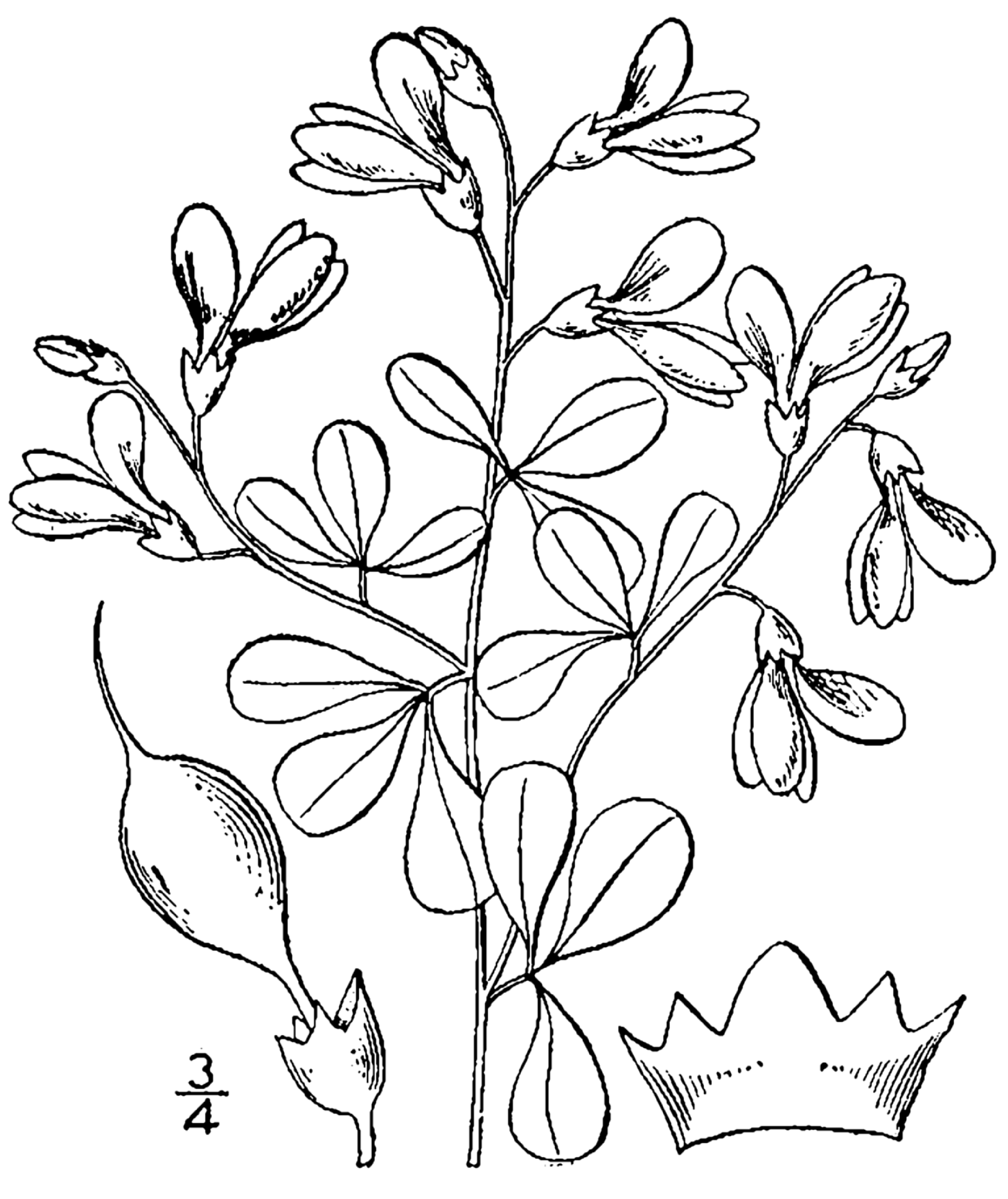
Line drawing

== Description ==
The multiple bushy stems of Baptisia tinctoria reach 2 to 3 feet tall. The leaves are silver-green; each is divided into three leaflets about ½ inch long. The flowers are yellow and grow in spikes 1½ to 3 inches long.

The leaves are eaten by some lepidopteran caterpillars, for example the Io moth (Automeris io).

On Martha's Vineyard, the species is a tumbleweed: it grows in a globular form, breaks off at the root in the autumn, and tumbles about.
