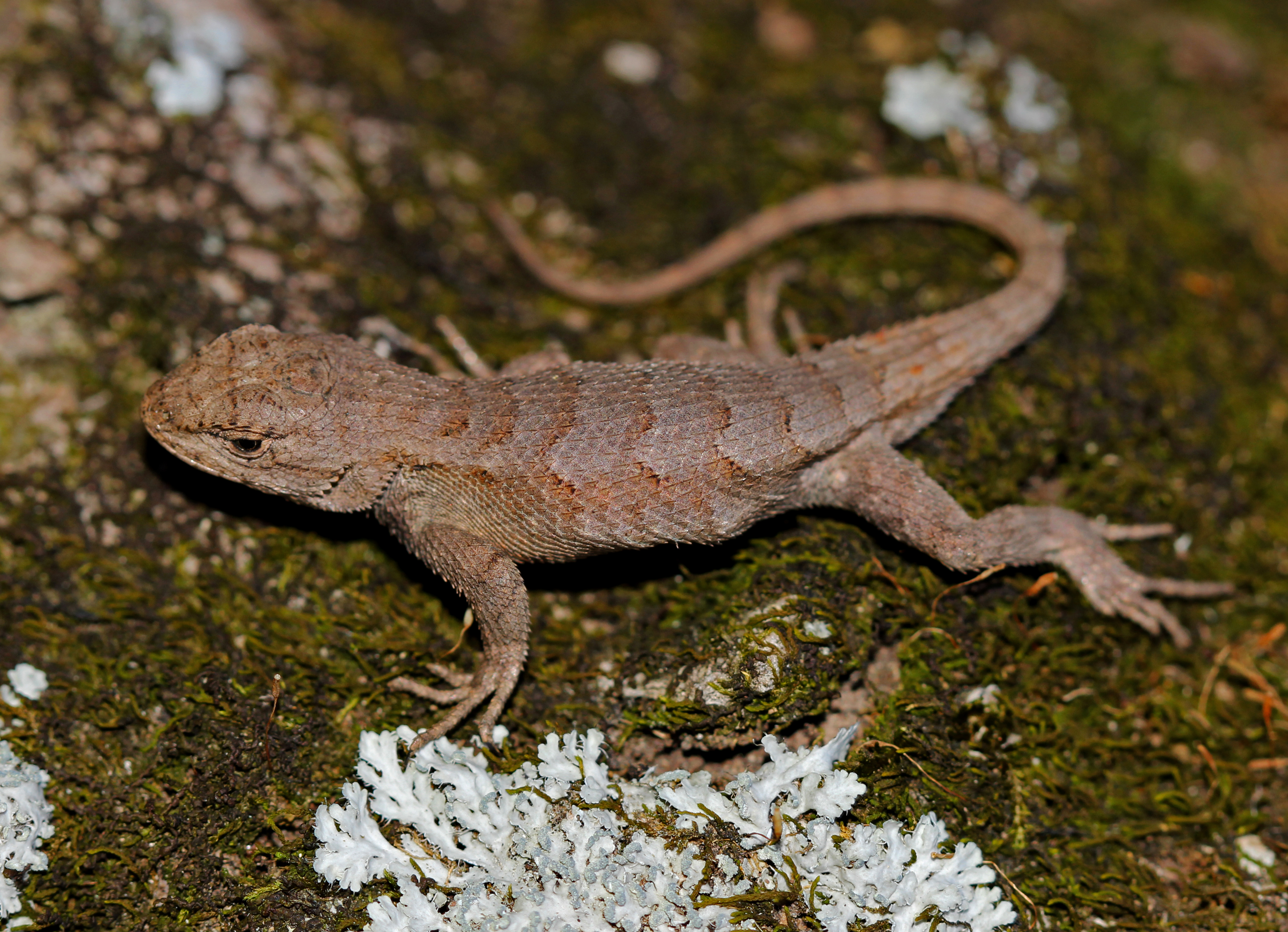

Scientific classification
- Kingdom: Animalia
- Phylum: Chordata
- Class: Reptilia
- Order: Squamata
- Suborder: Iguania
- Family: Phrynosomatidae
- Genus: Sceloporus
- Species: S. consobrinus

Binomial name
- Sceloporus consobrinus Baird & Girard, 1854

= Sceloporus consobrinus =

Species of lizard

Sceloporus consobrinus, the prairie lizard, is a species of lizard in the family Phrynosomatidae. It is found in Nebraska, Kansas, Oklahoma, Texas, Arkansas, Louisiana, eastern Colorado, southwestern Missouri, eastern New Mexico, southwestern Mississippi, southeastern Wyoming, and southern South Dakota in the United States.
