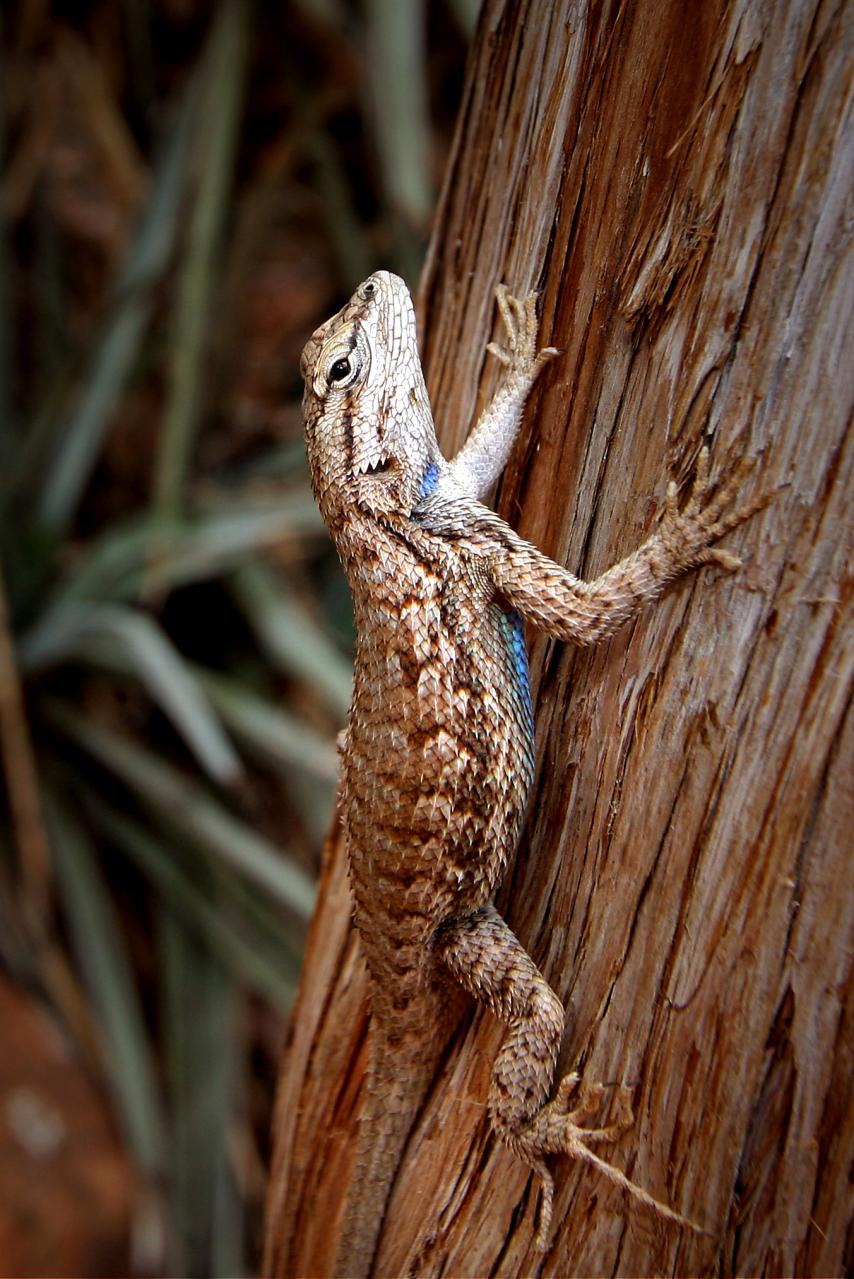

Scientific classification
- Domain: Eukaryota
- Kingdom: Animalia
- Phylum: Chordata
- Class: Reptilia
- Order: Squamata
- Suborder: Iguania
- Family: Phrynosomatidae
- Genus: Sceloporus
- Species: S. tristichus

Binomial name
- Sceloporus tristichus Cope, 1875

= Plateau fence lizard =

Species of spiny lizard

The plateau fence lizard (Sceloporus tristichus) is a species of spiny lizard in the family Phrynosomatidae.

== Description ==
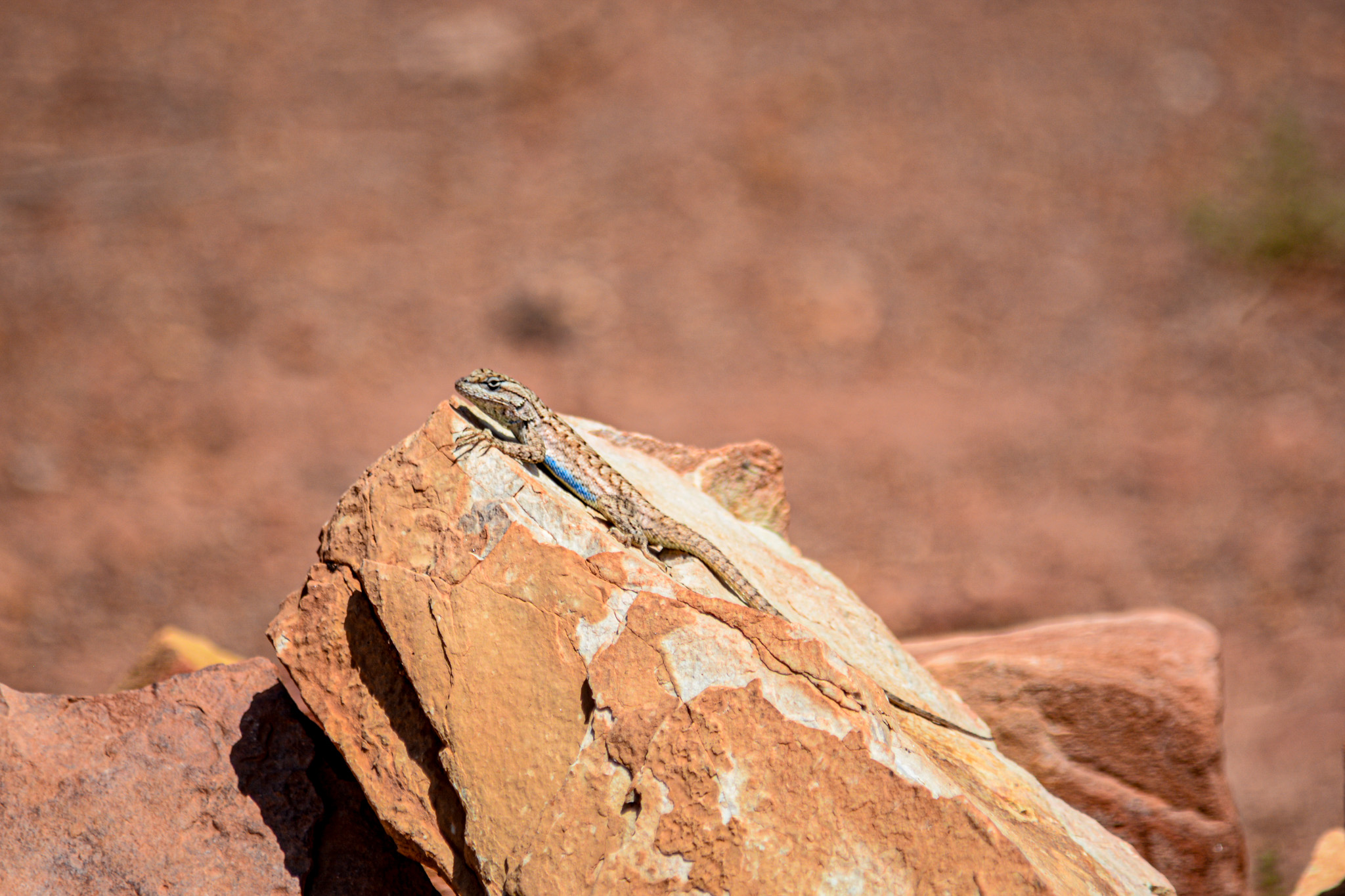
Plateau Fence Lizard in Utah

At up to 80 millimetres (3.1 in) from snout to vent, the plateau fence lizard is a grayish, brownish, or greenish lizard. The upper side of its body has keeled scales and there is a series of narrow dark brown cross-bands on both sides of the midline. An elongated metallic blue patch can be found on each side of the belly and each side of the throat.

Males are typically smaller than females, as with many squamates, with males and females in Montezuma County, Colorado measuring 63 mm (2.5 in) and 67 mm (2.6 in), respectively.

== Distribution ==
The plateau fence lizard is generally found in central Arizona, southwestern Utah, western Colorado, and the San Luis Valley. It can also be found in parts of New Mexico and Wyoming.

== Habitat ==
The plateau fence lizard generally dwells in rocky and wooded areas, making use of canyon walls, boulder-strewn hillsides, fallen tree trunks, and other debris and vantage points.

== Ecology ==
The plateau fence lizard is inactive during cold periods and the hottest part of the day in summer.

The lizard consumes mainly insects, spiders, and other arthropods.
