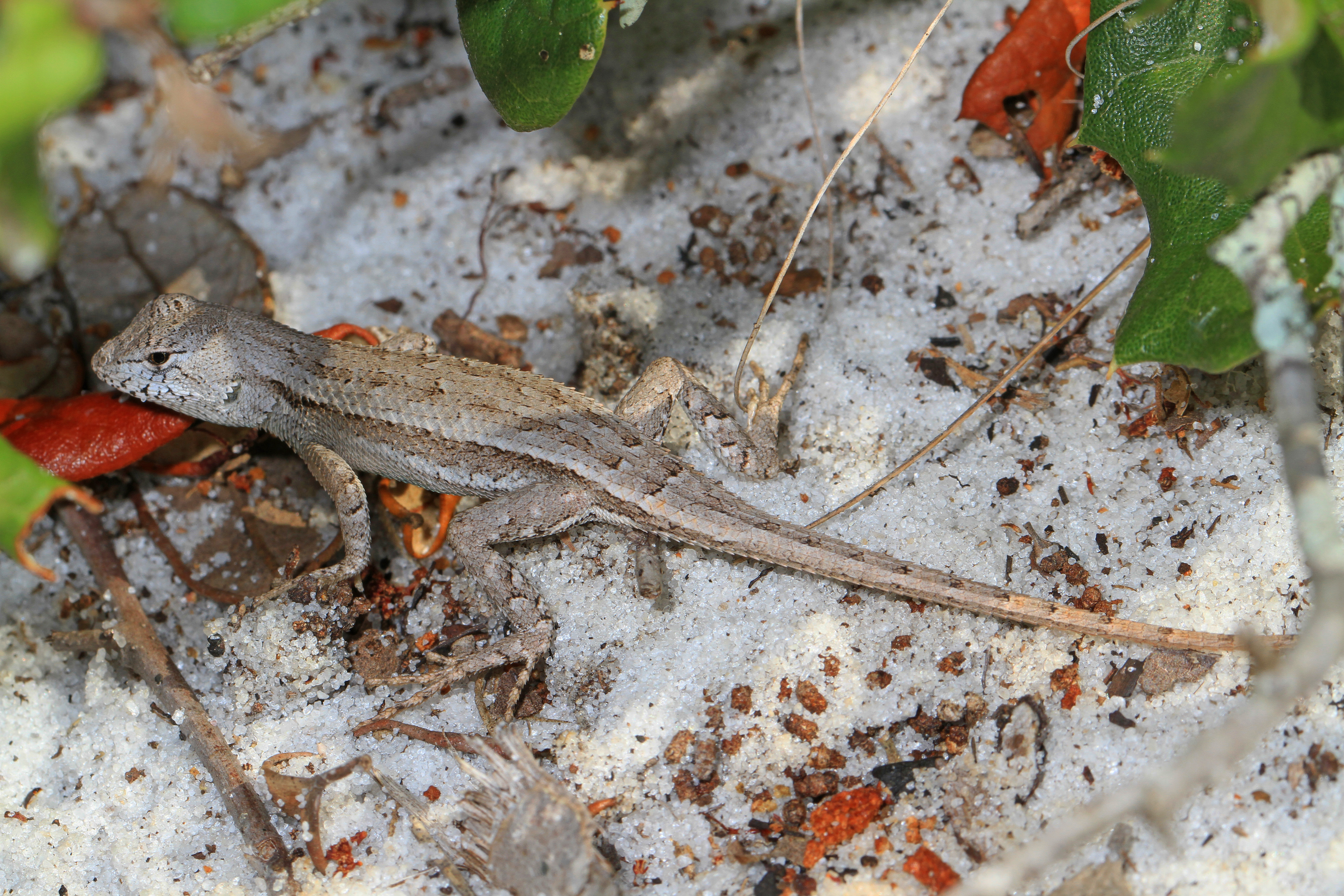
- Photographed at Lake Placid, Florida

Conservation status
- Near Threatened (IUCN 3.1)

- Imperiled (NatureServe)

Scientific classification
- Kingdom: Animalia
- Phylum: Chordata
- Class: Reptilia
- Order: Squamata
- Suborder: Iguania
- Family: Phrynosomatidae
- Genus: Sceloporus
- Species: S. woodi

Binomial name
- Sceloporus woodi Stejneger, 1918
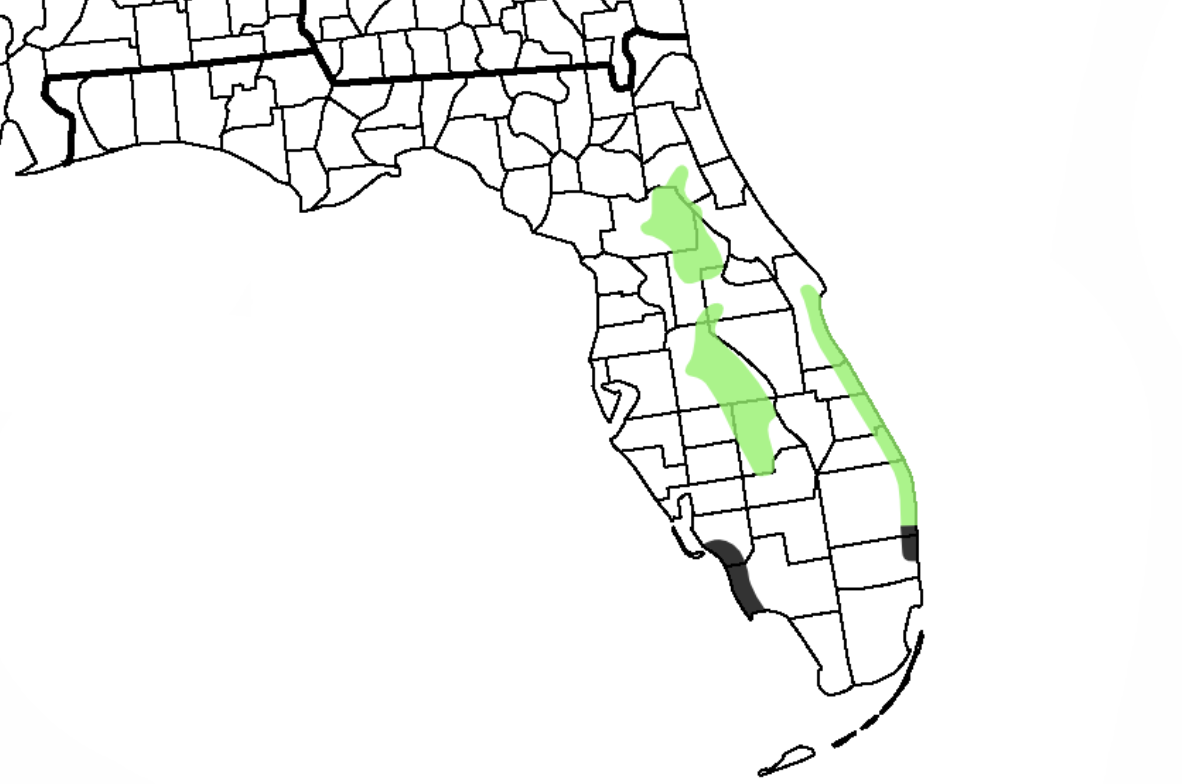
- Green: native range, Black: former range

= Florida scrub lizard =

Species of lizard

The Florida scrub lizard (Sceloporus woodi) is a species of lizard in the family Phrynosomatidae. The species is endemic to Florida, the United States.

== Etymology ==
The specific name, woodi, is in honor of taxidermist Nelson R. Wood (died 1920) of the Smithsonian Institution who collected the holotype.

== Description ==
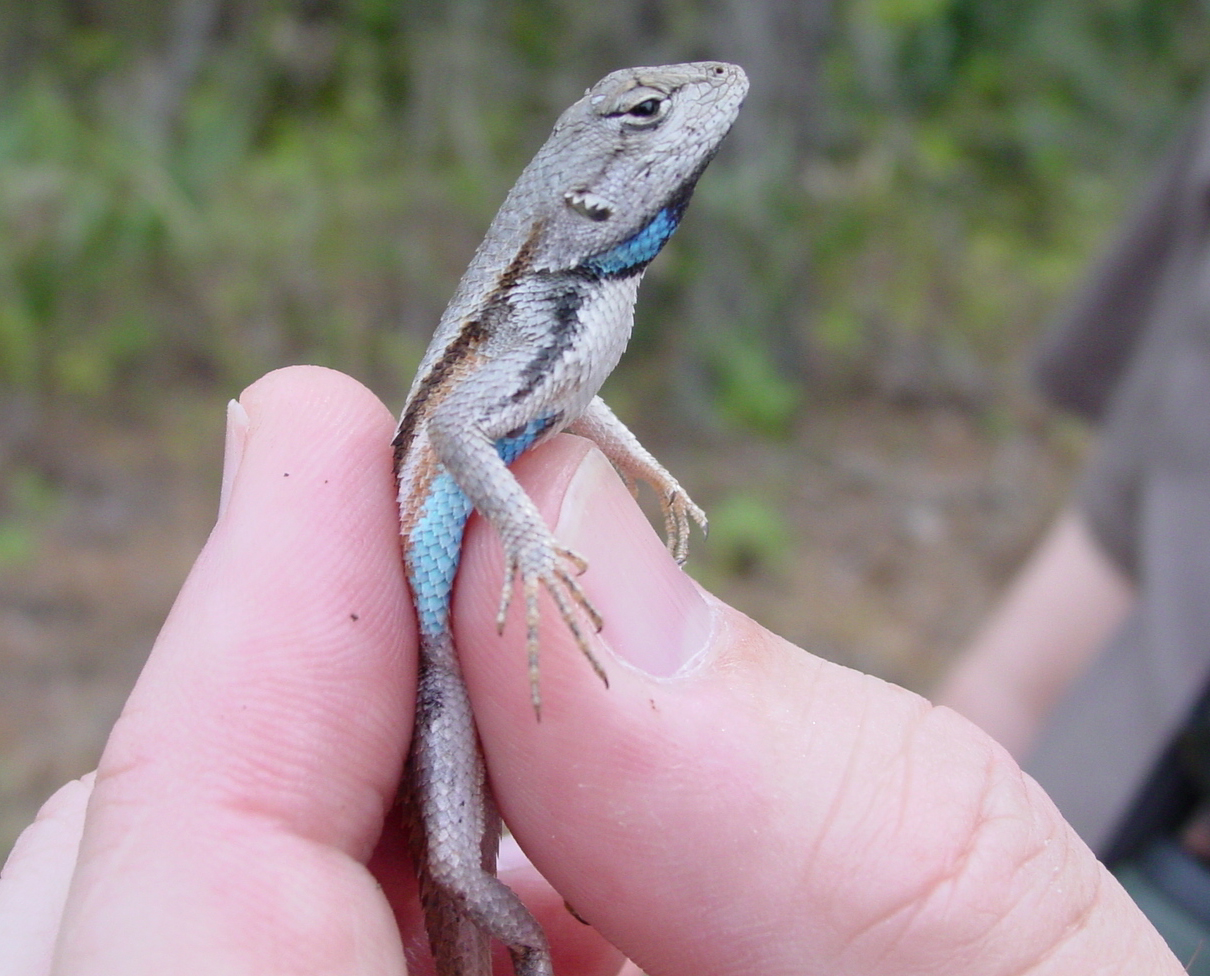
Held by human hand

The adult Florida scrub lizard is about 5 inches (13 cm) in total length (including tail). It is gray or brownish with a longitudinal brown stripe down each side of the body. The male has turquoise patches on the throat and belly. The female usually lacks the throat patches, but may have lighter patches on the abdomen.

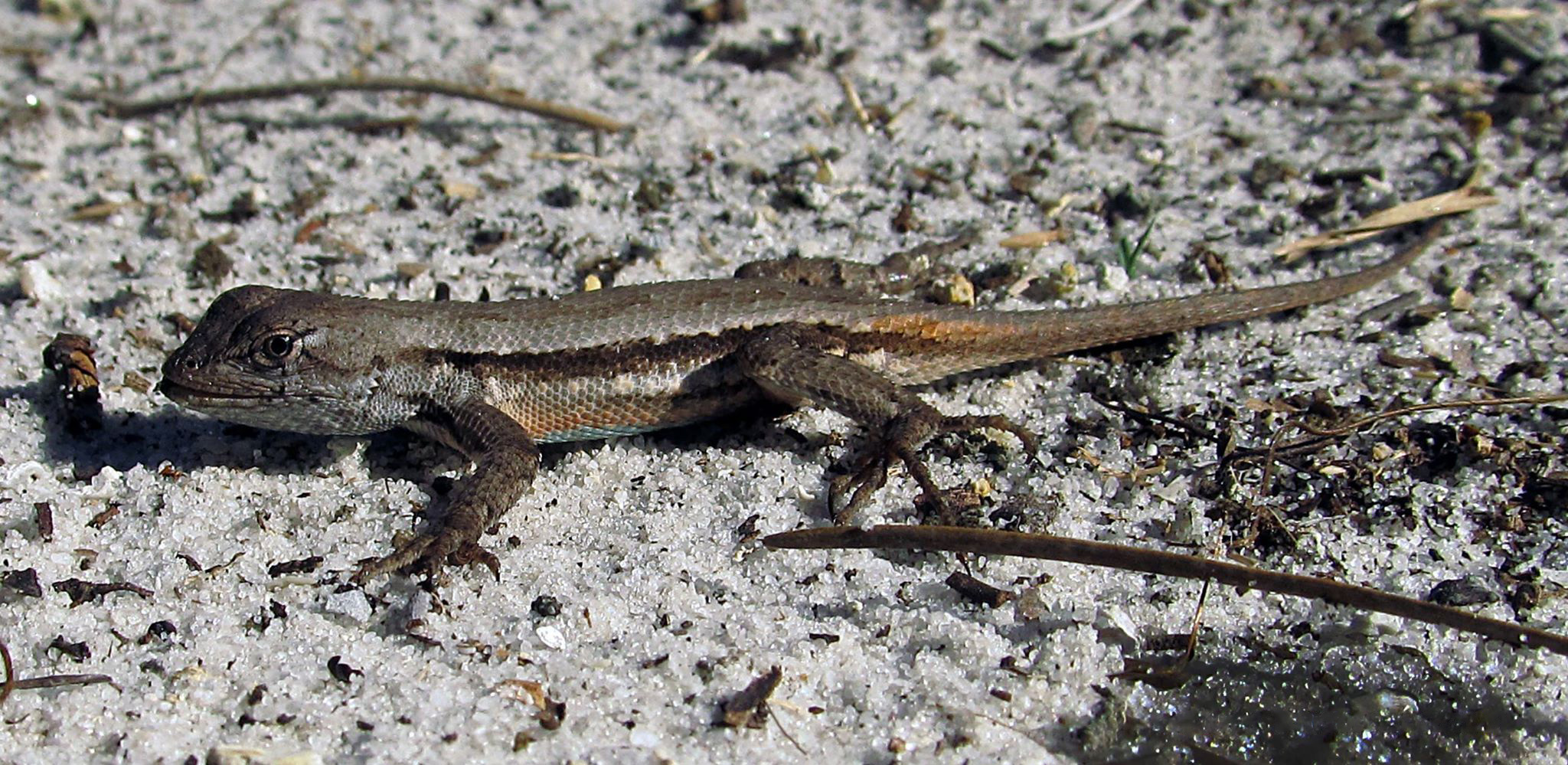
Highlands, Florida

== Reproduction ==
Courtship and mating of S. woodi occur in spring. The female buries up to 5 clutches of 2 to 8 eggs each. Eggs take about 75 days to hatch, probably depending on ambient temperature. The last hatchlings of the year emerge in November. The lizard becomes sexually mature in 10 to 11 months.

== Habitat ==
The preferred natural habitat of S. woodi is Florida scrub, including evergreen oak and sand pine scrub. It is found less often in the ecotone between scrub and sandhill habitat, flatwoods, and citrus groves. It is most common in dry habitats with open basking areas and nesting with nearby pines or oaks for shelter. A closed canopy makes the habitat unsuitable.

== Geographic range and conservation status ==
S. woodi has a disjunct distribution with four main population areas, the Atlantic coast scrubs, the Gulf Coast scrubs, the inland central peninsula, and Ocala National Forest and environs. It occurs on the Lake Wales Ridge. It is common in the Ocala National Forest, but it is slowly declining in most of its range due to loss of habitat. It was more widespread before the intensive development of Florida's scrub zones and sandy ridges. Habitat loss to development, including the establishment of citrus groves, has reduced populations. Fire suppression causes habitat changes such as closure of the canopy, which eliminates the open spaces required by the species. It has been wiped out from its former range off Florida's Gulf Coast in Collier and Lee County, and also off the Atlantic coast of Florida south of Palm Beach County.

This species occurs in widely spaced patches of a habitat type that is naturally fragmented, and it does not disperse far from its natal area. The main population groups have remained separate for many thousands of years, causing isolation that has led to the development of high genetic diversity in the species as a whole. During conservation efforts, it is important to maintain such diversity.
