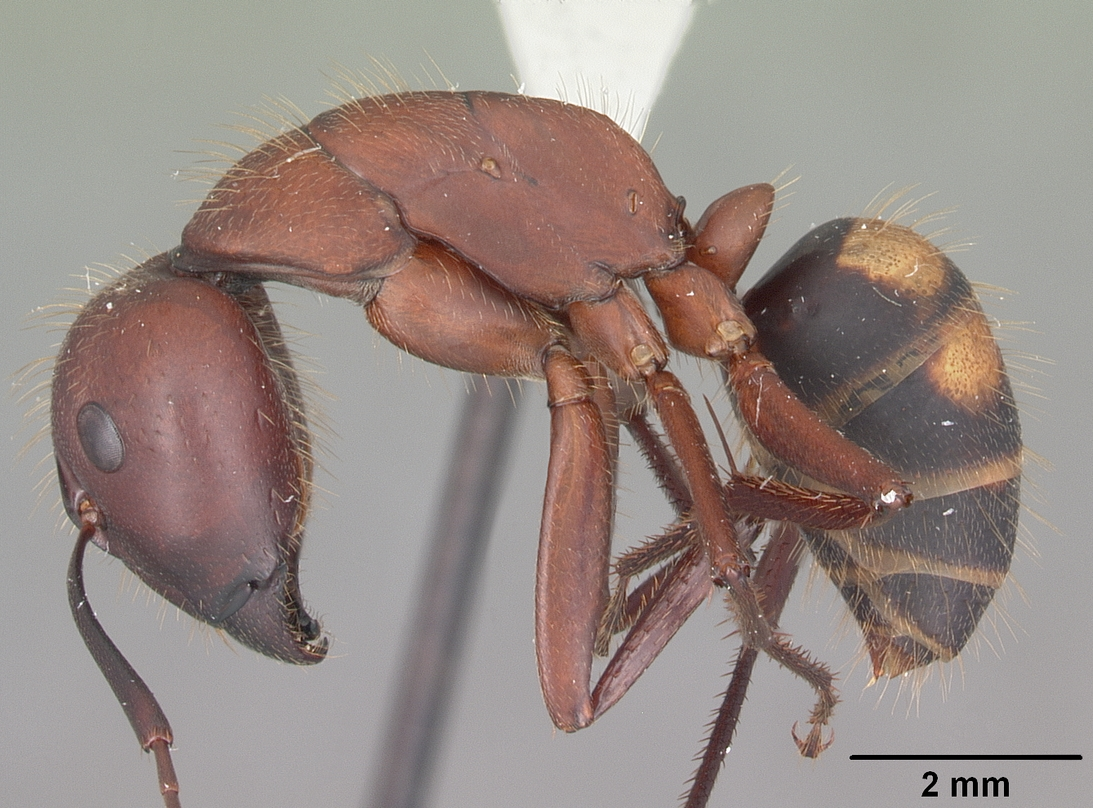
- Camponotus socius worker

Scientific classification
- Kingdom: Animalia
- Phylum: Arthropoda
- Clade: Pancrustacea
- Class: Insecta
- Order: Hymenoptera
- Family: Formicidae
- Subfamily: Formicinae
- Genus: Camponotus
- Subgenus: Tanaemyrmex
- Species: C. socius

Binomial name
- Camponotus socius Roger, 1863

= Camponotus socius =

Species of ant

Camponotus socius, the sandhill carpenter ant, is a large species of ant in the genus Camponotus. It was first described by Julius Roger (1863), based on specimens from Brazil - however these can be considered highly dubious as the location where the type specimens were collected (Amazonas) does not fit the known ecology of the species within North America, where it exhibits traits typical of a native species. It is well adapted to the sandy soils of xeric woodlands found within the coastal plains of the southeastern United States. Its range includes the US states of Georgia, Alabama, Florida, North and South Carolina and Mississippi.

== Description ==
Camponotus socius is characterized by a variegated gaster somewhat resembling that of a wasp, having deep bronze to apricot orange bands on each tergite that vary in extent and intensity depending on the local population and environment. The thorax and legs are typically a rusty brownish burgundy or vermilion and the head is most often a darker brown maroon. This species is polymorphic with the minor caste exhibiting elongated heads and spindly body proportions as characteristic of carpenter ants in the subgenus Tanaemyrmex. The scape of the antennae lacks hair. They are amongst the largest of North American Carpenter ant species with the minor workers ranging between 7.5 - 10 mm and majors reaching lengths of 16 mm on average. The large queens are typically around 17 - 18 mm in length and may reach 20 mm if physogastric. The males are a concolorous black and are around 14 mm in length.

== Biology ==
C. socius exclusively prefers areas with well draining sandy soils with partial or extensive shade coverage to live in, such as in xeric sandhill habitats for which they're named after. The nests are typically around 60 cm deep with lobed chamber networks that are gradually enlarged over time as the colony grows. Numerous satellite nests are constructed and occupied by a single colony which the workers actively move to and from. The nests themselves are inconspicuous as they're usually hidden within the vegetation of the forest floor, with the entrance of the nests presenting as simple holes on the ground. Excavating workers put great effort into carrying material far from the nest to avoid any mound building, with the refuse deposited irregularly a couple centimeters away from the entrance.

These ants retreat to their nests during the hottest hours of the day, and are otherwise primarily active in the early morning and late evening hours where foraging and nest maintenance work is carried out by the workers. The entrance of the nests are left open throughout the day with little to no activity through the afternoon after the colony has retreated. Diurnal activity may also continue longer through the day in colonies located in more heavily shaded areas or during prolonged cloudy weather. Like other carpenter ants, C. socius is an omnivorous opportunist where the workers will readily prey or scavenge upon arthropods or forage on native shrubs for honeydew excreted by sap-sucking hemipterans. Workers may also be seen feeding on lizard or bird faeces for the urea content. Typical of large carpenter ants in North America, C. socius experiences a period of diapause which may extend for as long as 2 - 3 months in the northernmost extent of their range.

Populations appear to be locally abundant in undisturbed areas of suitable habitat. Within Florida they are most commonly found in remaining longleaf pine sandhill or xeric hammock habitat, with an apparent preference for the latter as populations appear most dense in upland forests dominated by oaks. The nests are typically located at the tree line of these dense forests in semi-open areas. Colonies may also sometimes be seen in particularly dense fields of Scrub Palmetto. C. socius appears to be absent in most areas near or close to human habitation and as a result are seldom seen for an ant of their size, however colonies may continue to persist in recently developed areas. Despite being carpenter ants, these innocuous natives are not a threat to homes as they chiefly nest in sandy soils.

=== Reproduction ===
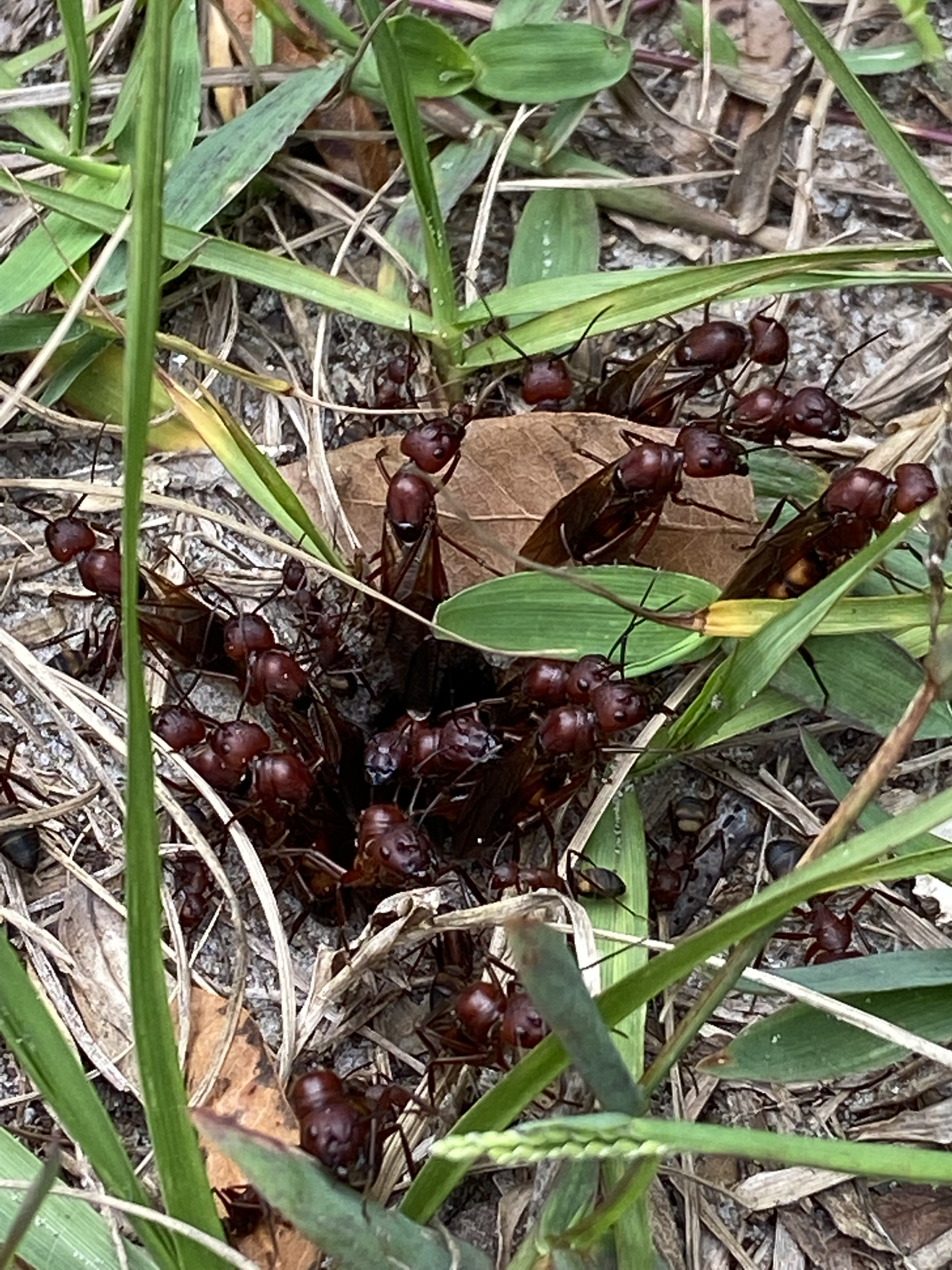
Pre-nuptial flight behavior of Camponotus socius.

Reproductive brood is overwintered and reared into the following year. Alates eclose by midsummer and are released in nuptial flights between August and early November. Alates can be observed scanning the perimeter of their nests on warm, windless, and overcast days after heavy rains between the hours of 2 and 5 p.m. If good conditions persist up to or through 4 p.m, the alates will begin to swarm out of their natal nest; females will walk a considerable distance away before taking to the air, while the males typically take off directly from the nest. The fully claustral queens excavate their founding chambers the following morning, where they will lay dormant for half a month to three months before raising the first generation of workers.

Each individual colony will only rear a few hundred alates every season. The first flights are typically the largest with subsequent flights being smaller in size.
