= Atlantic Plain =

Physiographic division of the United States

Coordinates: 32°N 83°W

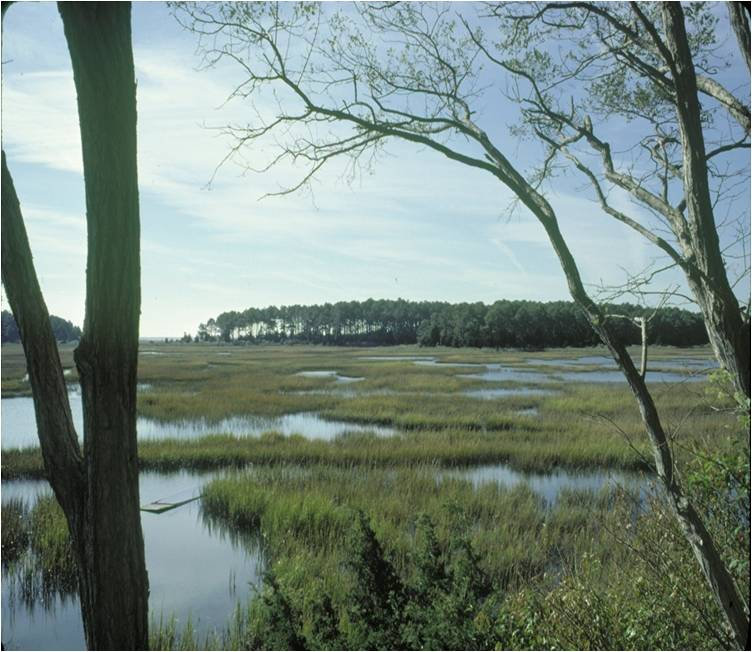
Marshland in the Atlantic Plain, located in the Eastern Shore of Virginia

The Atlantic Plain is one of eight distinct physiographic divisions of the contiguous United States. Using the USGS physiographic classification system, the Atlantic Plain division comprises two provinces and six sections. The Coastal Plain province is differentiated from the Continental Shelf province simply based on the portion of the land mass above and below sea level.

The lands adjacent to the Atlantic coastline are made up of sandy beaches, marshlands, bays, and barrier islands. It is the flattest of the U.S. physiographic divisions and stretches over 2,200 miles (3,500 km) in length from Cape Cod to the Mexican border and southward an additional 1,000 miles (1,600 km) to the Yucatán Peninsula. The central and southern Atlantic Coast is characterized by barrier and drowned valley coasts. The coastal Atlantic Plain features nearly continuous barriers interrupted by inlets, large embayments with drowned river valleys, and extensive wetlands and marshes. The Atlantic plain slopes gently seaward from the inland highlands in a series of terraces. This gentle slope continues far into the Atlantic and Gulf of Mexico, forming the continental shelf. The relief at the land-sea interface is so low that the boundary between them is often blurry and indistinct, especially along stretches of the Louisiana bayous and the Florida Everglades.

== Continental Shelf ==
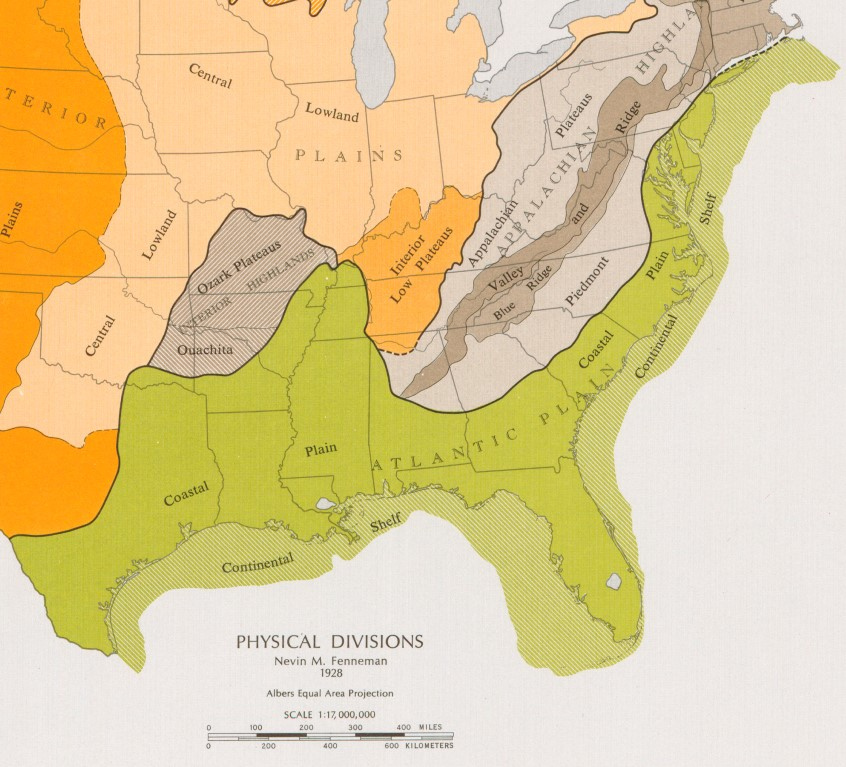
Extent of the Atlantic Plain Continental Shelf province as indicated by the 1928 work by Fenneman.

The Atlantic Ocean has a broad, flat continental shelf that reaches a depth of 100 meters. The continental shelf off the Atlantic Ocean ranges in width from less than 1 km off Florida to more than 420 km off Maine. The average width is about 135 km.

== Coastal Plain ==
The Coastal Plain of the United States includes all or portions of the states of Alabama, Arkansas, Delaware, Florida, Georgia, Kentucky, Maryland, Massachusetts, Mississippi, Missouri, New Jersey, New York, North Carolina, Oklahoma, Pennsylvania, (Note: Portions of Bucks, Delaware, and Philadelphia counties are specifically included in the Physiographic provinces of Pennsylvania map created by the Pennsylvania Geological Survey) South Carolina, Rhode Island, (Note: New Shoreham, Rhode Island is specifically included in the polygonal database created by the USGS) Tennessee, Texas and Virginia. From the northeast, it begins on Cape Cod, Massachusetts and stretches to the southwest to South Padre Island, Texas. This is approximately 1,900 miles (3,100 km).

This province consists of the following physiographic sections: the Embayed, Sea Island, Floridian, East Gulf Coastal Plain, Mississippi Alluvial Plain, and the West Gulf Coastal Plain.

The rocks in the province consist, for the most part, of layers of sand and clay which are not yet hardened into sandstone and shale. The Coastal Plain features nearly continuous barrier islands interrupted by inlets, large embayments with drowned river valleys, and extensive wetlands and marshes. The Coastal Plain slopes gently seaward from the inland highlands in a series of terraces.

The province's elevation is less than 90 meters above sea level and extends some 50 to 100 kilometers inland from the ocean. The coastal plain is normally wet, including many rivers, marsh, and swampland. It is composed primarily of sedimentary rock and unlithified sediments and is primarily used for agriculture. The Atlantic Coastal Plain includes the Carolina Sandhills region as well as the Embayed and Sea Island physiographic provinces. The Atlantic Coastal Plain is sometimes subdivided into northern and southern regions, specifically the Mid-Atlantic and South Atlantic coastal plains.

== Geology ==
The Atlantic Plain is generally gently dipping undeformed Mesozoic and Cenozoic sediments, with the sedimentary wedge thickening toward the sea, reaching a maximum thickness of about 3 kilometers (10,000 ft) in the vicinity of Cape Hatteras, North Carolina.

== Ecology ==
=== Flora ===
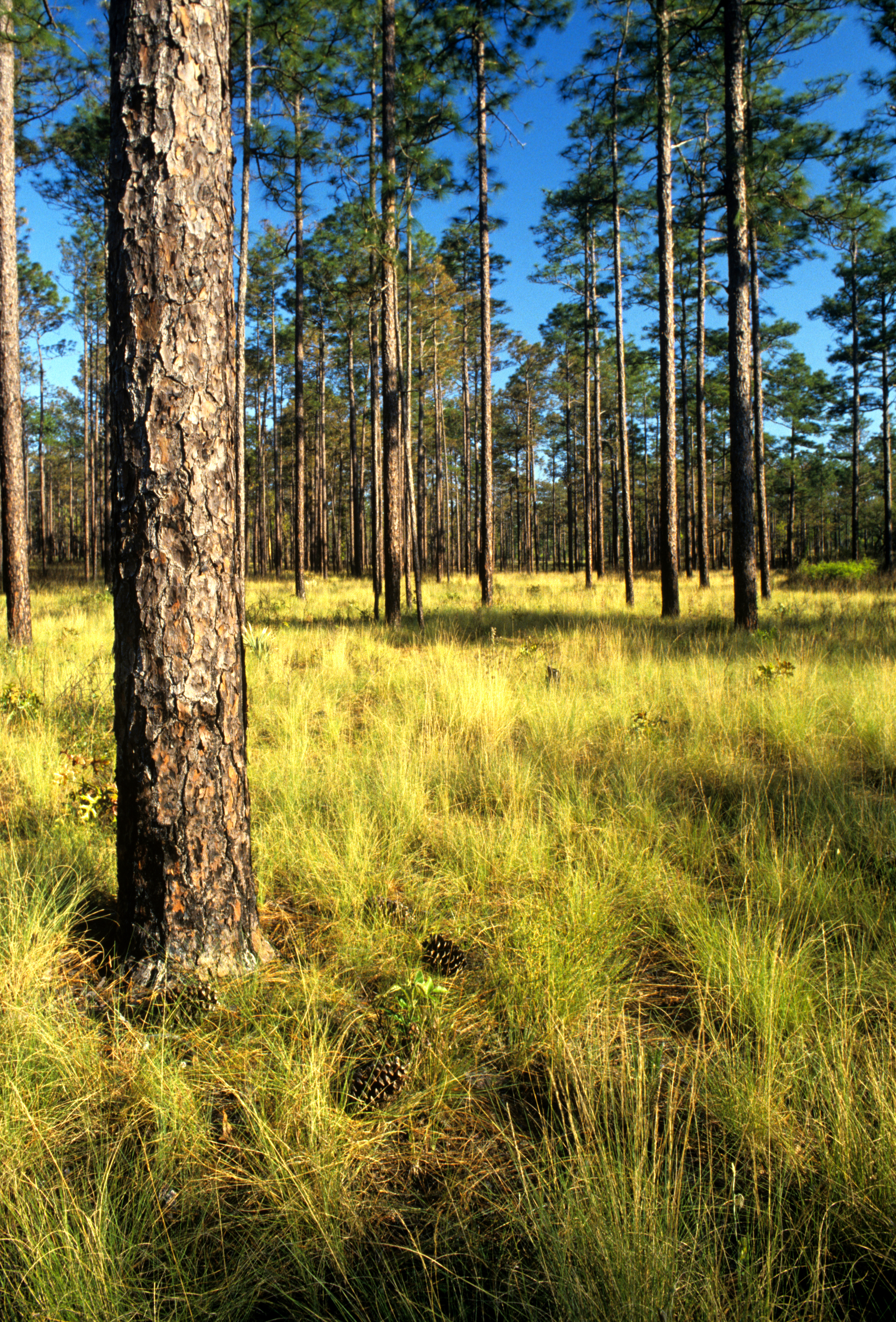
Longleaf pine woodland savanna, typical of the region.

Despite being previously overlooked in research, the Atlantic Coastal Plain is now identified as a global biodiversity hotspot, with over 1500 endemic plant species, and ~70% habitat loss. This endemism is particularly high in the longleaf pine savannas and woodlands, along with the other herbaceous and fire dependent ecosystems of the ecoregion. Despite intermittent flooding, certain refugia have remained continuously terrestrial since at least the late Cretaceous (85-80mya), contributing to endemism. Generally speaking, despite the high diversity of soils, the soil is nutrient poor. This is primarily due to an abundance of well-drained soils, creating a primarily xeric character to the floral makeup of the Atlantic Plain. However, waterlogged soils are also notable, with wetlands and hammocks being important ecological features.

The Eastern woodlands are the original, predominant ecosystem of the Atlantic coastal plain. The Atlantic coastal plain upland longleaf pine woodland is an endemic plant community found in most of the Atlantic coastal plain, ranging from Virginia to northern Florida. These woodland savannas are reliant on sandy soils and are fire dependent, lest hardwoods start to dominate. Alongside longleaf pine, typically associated flora includes turkey oak and wiregrass. The Florida longleaf pine sandhill extends the longleaf pine forests into central Florida, with South Florida slash pine flatwoods, Florida sand pine scrub and Florida dry prairie stretching into southern Florida. Longleaf pine woodlands also stretch further west, to eastern Texas. These consist of East Gulf and West Gulf longleaf pine flatwoods, bisected by the Mississippi Alluvial Plain.

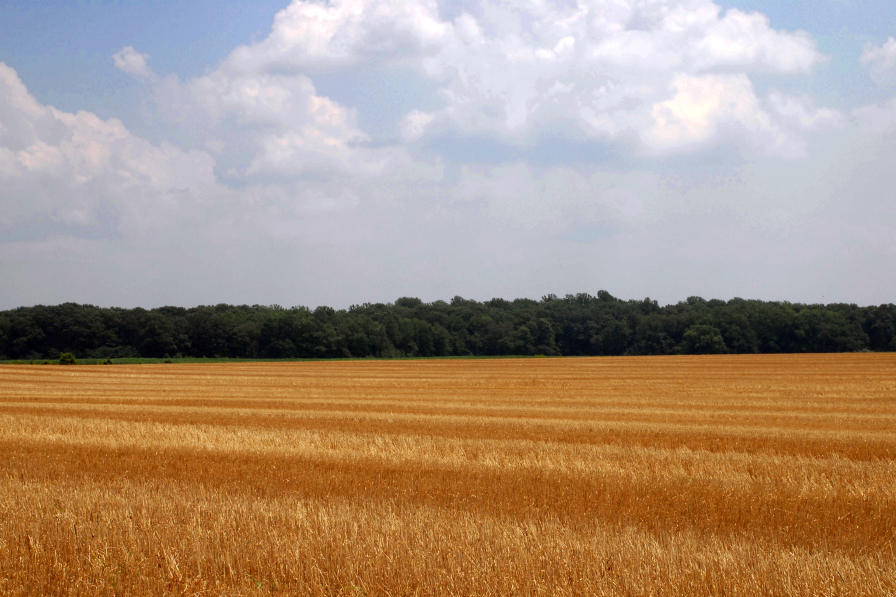
Wheat field near Centreville on the Eastern Shore of Maryland, with flat terrain typical of the Atlantic Plain

To the north, the Atlantic Coastal Plain also broaches into the mesic hardwood forests of the Middle Atlantic coastal forests, followed by the northern Atlantic coastal pine barrens. The southernmost Atlantic Plain contains the only Neotropical ecoregion of the continental USA, being the Everglades and Florida mangroves.

=== Fauna ===
The following species are largely endemic to the region. Amphibian diversity is especially notable in the Atlantic Plain.

==== North ====
- Pine Barrens tree frog (Dryophytes andersonii)
- Northern red-bellied cooter (Pseudemys rubriventris)
- Heath hen (Tympanuchus cupido cupido) EX
- Beach vole (Microtus breweri)
- Red wolf (Canis rufus)

==== South ====
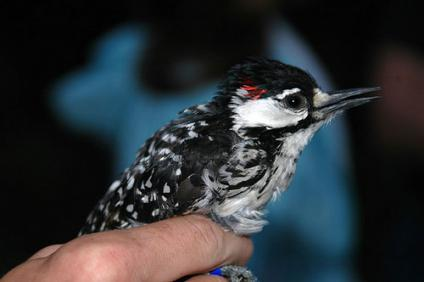
The red-cockaded woodpecker was once a widespread, signature species across the Atlantic Plain.

Some of these species' ranges may extend into the longleaf pine woodlands and savannas of the Gulf Plain.

- Red-cockaded woodpecker (Picoides borealis)
- Brown-headed nuthatch (Sitta pusilla)
- Bachman's sparrow (Peucaea aestivalis)
- Florida scrub jay (Aphelocoma coerulescens)
- Ivory-billed woodpecker (Campephilus principalis) EX
- American alligator (Alligator mississippiensis)
- Gopher tortoise (Gopherus polyphemus)
- Chicken turtle (Deirochelys reticularia)
- Florida worm lizard (Rhineura floridana)
- Eastern indigo snake (Drymarchon couperi)
- Eastern diamondback rattlesnake (Crotalus adamanteus)
- Southeastern pocket gopher (Geomys pinetis)
- Round-tailed muskrat (Neofiber alleni)
- Two-toed amphiuma (Amphiuma means)
- Oak toad (Anaxyrus quercicus)
- Frosted flatwoods salamander (Ambystoma cingulatum)
- Striped newt (Notophthalmus perstriatus)
