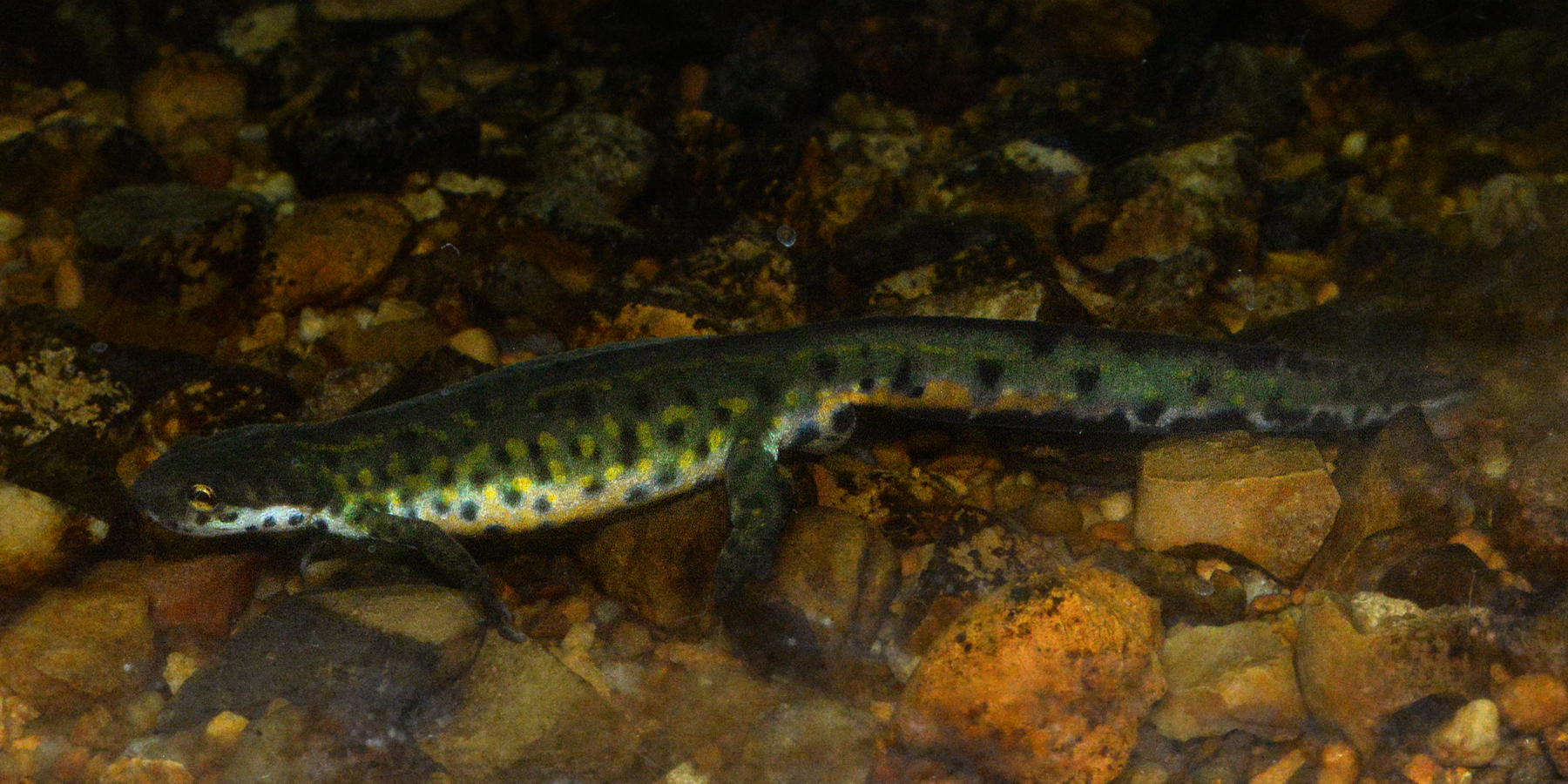

Conservation status
- Vulnerable (IUCN 3.1)

Scientific classification
- Kingdom: Animalia
- Phylum: Chordata
- Class: Amphibia
- Order: Urodela
- Family: Salamandridae
- Genus: Notophthalmus
- Species: N. meridionalis

Binomial name
- Notophthalmus meridionalis (Cope, 1880)

Subspecies
- N. m. kallerti (Wolterstorff, 1930); N. m. meridionalis

Synonyms
- Diemyctylus miniatus meridionalis Cope, 1880; Molge meridionalis (Cope, 1880); Diemyctylus meridionalis (Cope, 1880); Triturus meridionalis (Cope, 1880); Diemyctylus kallerti Wolterstorff, 1930; Triturus kallerti (Wolterstorff, 1930); Notophthalmus kallerti (Wolterstorff, 1930)

= Notophthalmus meridionalis =

Black-spotted newt

North American species of amphibian

Notophthalmus meridionalis, the black-spotted newt or Texas newt, is a species of aquatic newt native to northeastern Mexico and southern Texas in the United States. This amphibian was put on the IUCN Red List of Endangered Species in 2008 with populations still decreasing. It was reclassified to Vulnerable in 2022.

== Description ==
The black-spotted newt (Notophthalmus meridionalis) is the largest extant member of the Notophthalmus genus. It has a snout-to-vent length of 42–57 mm in adults, with females being the larger sex. The black-spotted newt grows to 7.4–10.9 centimetres (2.9–4.3 in) long and is typically an olive green in color with numerous black spots. The underside is often yellow in color, which can sometimes extend up to the sides. These light markings tend to condense into larger spots that accumulate on the sides of the amphibian that eventually blend into a broken line extending from the base of the head to the end of the tail. The underside is often yellow in color, which can sometimes extend up to the sides. Sometimes the appearance of this newt will have a stripe down the back, pale brown or russet in color. The sides are blue-green and are noticeably lighter than the back; frequently there will be a white exhibited on the lower sides. The venter of the black-spotted newt is yellow to orange. They have smooth skin, and a paddle-shaped, vertically flattened tail. The black-spotted newt (Notophthalmus meridionalis) has a lighter dorsum color than the Mexican newt (Notophthalmus kallerti). The larvae of the black-spotted newt are generally gray-brown and have a dark midventral stripe. They are also patterned with small, light-colored spots forming lateral or ventrolateral rows.

== Habitat ==
Black-spotted newts prefer shallow-water habitats, heavy with vegetation. However, this type of habitat uncommonly occurs in the northern part of the specie's range. Otherwise, the black-spotted newt can be found among vegetation that is submerged in water. During the dry season, they are believed to burrow underground or remain under debris. Usually the black-spotted newt will burrow less than two meters deep within these saturated and vegetated areas. Since black-spotted newts prefer shallow-water habitats, heavy with vegetation, during the dry season, they are believed to burrow underground or remain under debris. When water dries up, they can be found under rocks and other structures. However, individuals are not believed to make it very far if forced to leave their habitats if the water completely dries up.

== Behavior ==
The life history of this species is not well known and the presence of an eft stage has yet to be determined. Breeding is not known to occur in any specific month, but rather is tied to rainfall. Breeding occurs year-round. After reproduction, the eggs are attached to a substrate within the water among the submerged vegetation preferably in shallow water. Generally, this species in unable to tolerate habitat disturbance like habitat destruction or pollution which are major threats to this species.

They are carnivorous, consuming a wide variety of prey, including insects, aquatic invertebrates, leeches, and other amphibians.

Newts are known for their brightly colored skin that advertises their toxic secretions from their poison glands. This coloration is called aposematic coloration. Their toxic skin secretions are used to deter predators. When disturbed, this species exhibits the unken reflex. This is a behavior where the organism contorts its body in a spiral fashion to expose its brightly colored underside and the head is tucked underneath the tail. This is presumed to be a way for this organism to signal its toxicity. After a period without disturbance, the newt will relax.

== Range ==
Notophthalmus meridionalis can be found in the states of Tamaulipas, Veracruz, and San Luis Potosí in Mexico, barely extending into northeastern Hidalgo and Puebla. It is also found in southern Texas along the Gulf of Mexico. Salamanders within the genus Notophthalmus are found in North America exclusively. There are three extant species: eastern newt (N. viridescens), black-spotted newt (N. meridionalis), and striped newt (N. perstriatus). The eastern newt (N. viridescens) ranges through the eastern United States whereas the black-spotted newt is restricted to southeastern Texas and northeastern Mexico. The progression of the black-spotted newt from its common ancestor is hypothesized to have started around the late Miocene epoch. The North American tropics retreated south causing an isolation of the Southeastern American plate. This biogeological event allowed Notophthalmus meridionalis in eastern Mexico and Notophthalmus perstriatus in Florida to diverge.

== Conservation ==
The black-spotted newt is listed as a threatened species in Texas and as a vulnerable species by the IUCN. The major threat to this species is human development; land is commonly altered for agriculture conversion or infrastructure. The more land that is converted, the less available habitat there is for the newts. This species has also become endangered in Texas from the use of insecticide and herbicide. Their permeable skin absorbs toxins which affects their nervous and muscular systems and ultimately leads to death; making them highly sensitive to water pollution. The black-spotted newt is not known to occur within protected areas through its range in Mexico. However, there are reports of this species found from the Laguna Atascosa and Santa Ana National Wildlife Refuges, and from the Audubon Sabal Palm Grove Sanctuary in Texas. Conservation efforts may also occur in other protected areas. This species is listed as threatened by Texas Parks, but the Mexican government recognizes the black-spotted newt as endangered.
