= Lygodesmia doloresensis =

Conservation status
- Critically Imperiled (NatureServe)

Scientific classification
- Kingdom: Plantae
- Clade: Tracheophytes
- Clade: Angiosperms
- Clade: Eudicots
- Clade: Asterids
- Order: Asterales
- Family: Asteraceae
- Genus: Lygodesmia
- Species: L. doloresensis

Binomial name
- Lygodesmia doloresensis S.Tomb

Species of flowering plant

Lygodesmia doloresensis is a species of flowering plant in the family Asteraceae known by the common name Dolores River skeletonplant. It is native to a small area of Colorado and neighboring Utah in the United States. This species is sometimes considered a variety of Lygodesmia grandiflora.

This plant is a perennial herb producing an erect, branching stem up to 30 centimeters tall. The leaves are threadlike to linear and measure up to 14 centimeters in length. The flower heads contain five ligulate florets in shades of lavender or pink to white.

This plant grows in juniper shrublands and grasslands on alluvial sandstone soils. It is found at only three sites. It grows in the Dolores River Canyon in Colorado and the Colorado River Canyon in Utah. Its habitat is heavily grazed by cattle, and the plant is only found in spots where the animals cannot graze, such as clumps of prickly pear.
