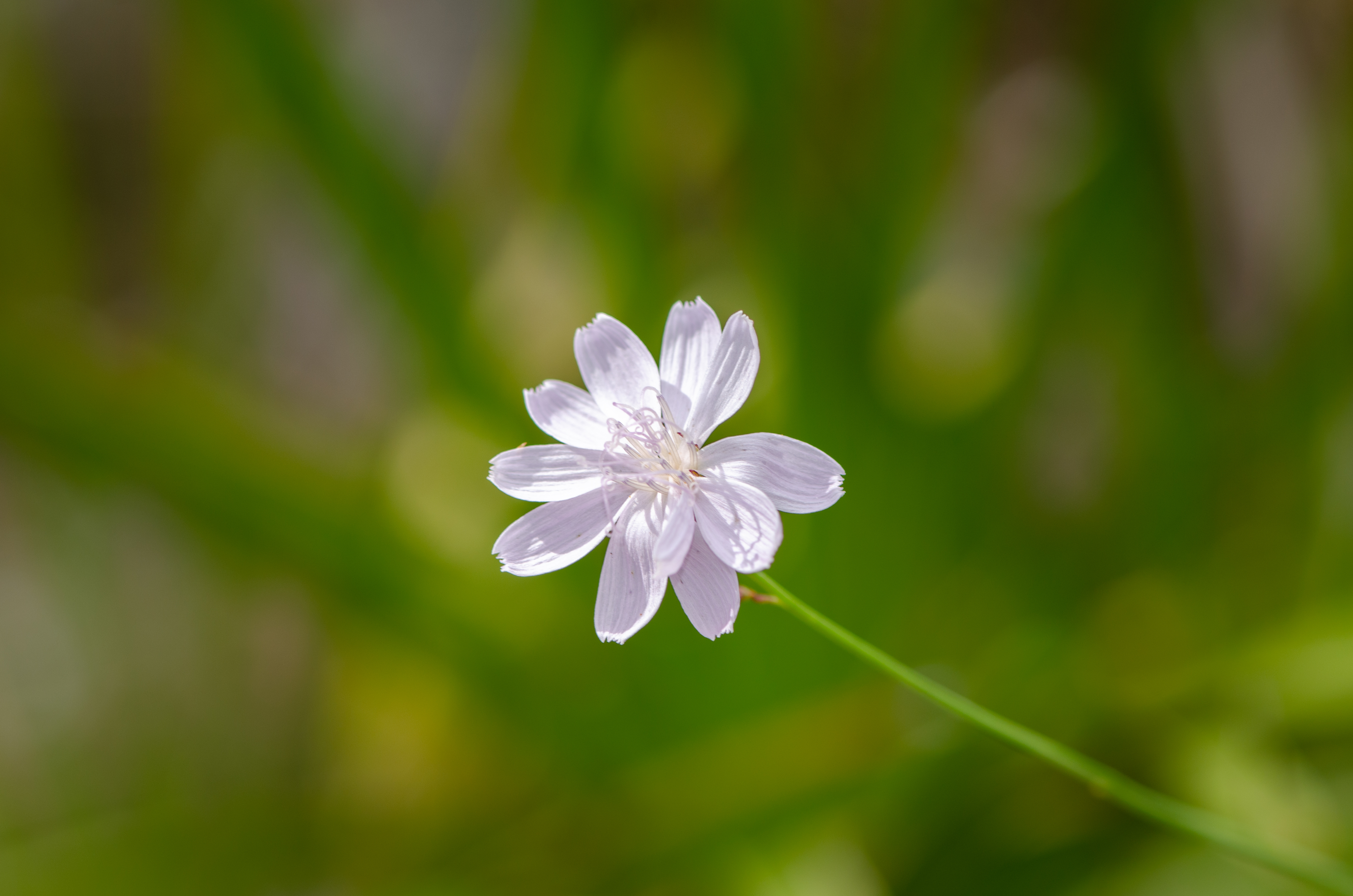

Conservation status
- Apparently Secure (NatureServe)

Scientific classification
- Kingdom: Plantae
- Clade: Tracheophytes
- Clade: Angiosperms
- Clade: Eudicots
- Clade: Asterids
- Order: Asterales
- Family: Asteraceae
- Genus: Lygodesmia
- Species: L. aphylla

Binomial name
- Lygodesmia aphylla Nutt.

= Lygodesmia aphylla =

Species of plant

Lygodesmia aphylla is a species of flowering plant in the family Asteraceae known by the common name rose rush or rushweed. It has white, pink, or lavender flowers. It grows in Florida and Georgia and reaches between 1 and 3 feet tall.

This species can be found in habitats with deep dry, loose, and/or gravelly soils. It has been observed in habitats such as Florida scrub, sandhill, pine flatwoods, and mixed woodlands. It attracts a variety of pollinators.

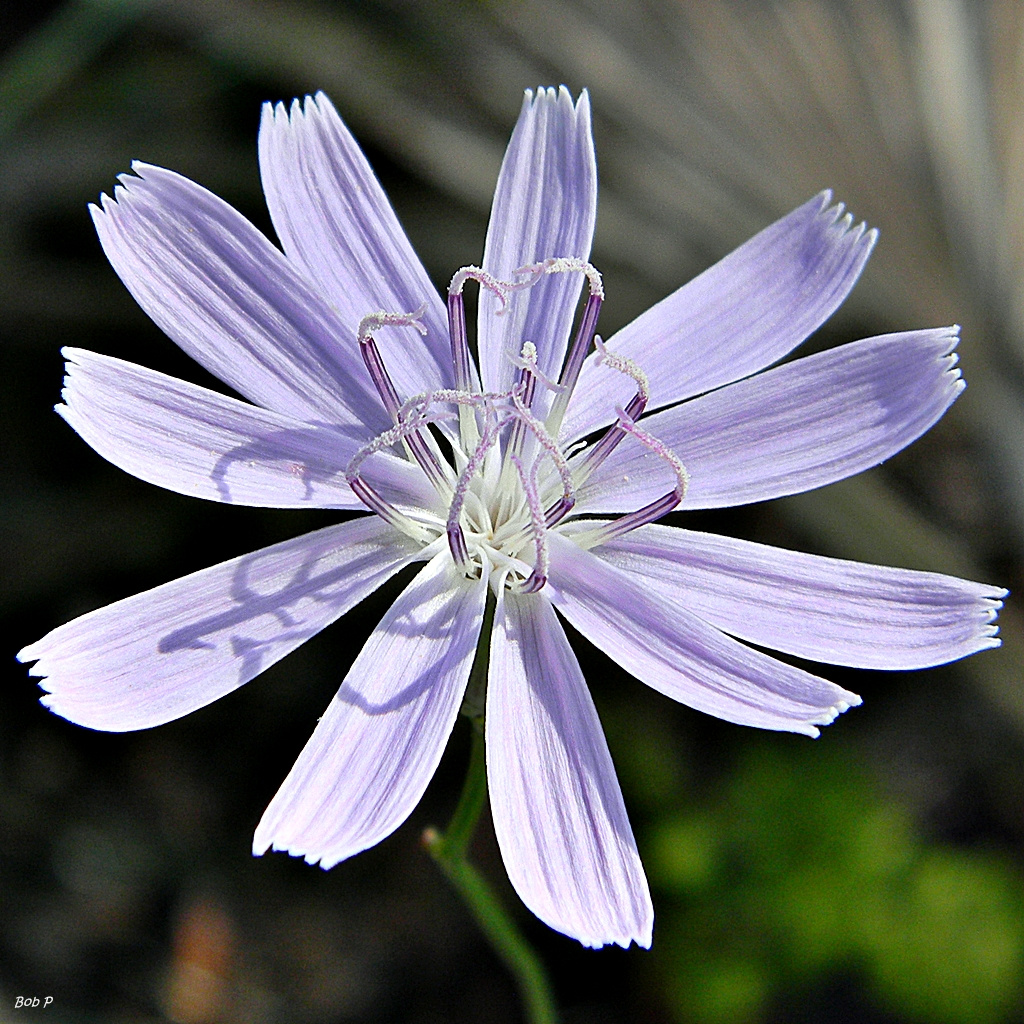
