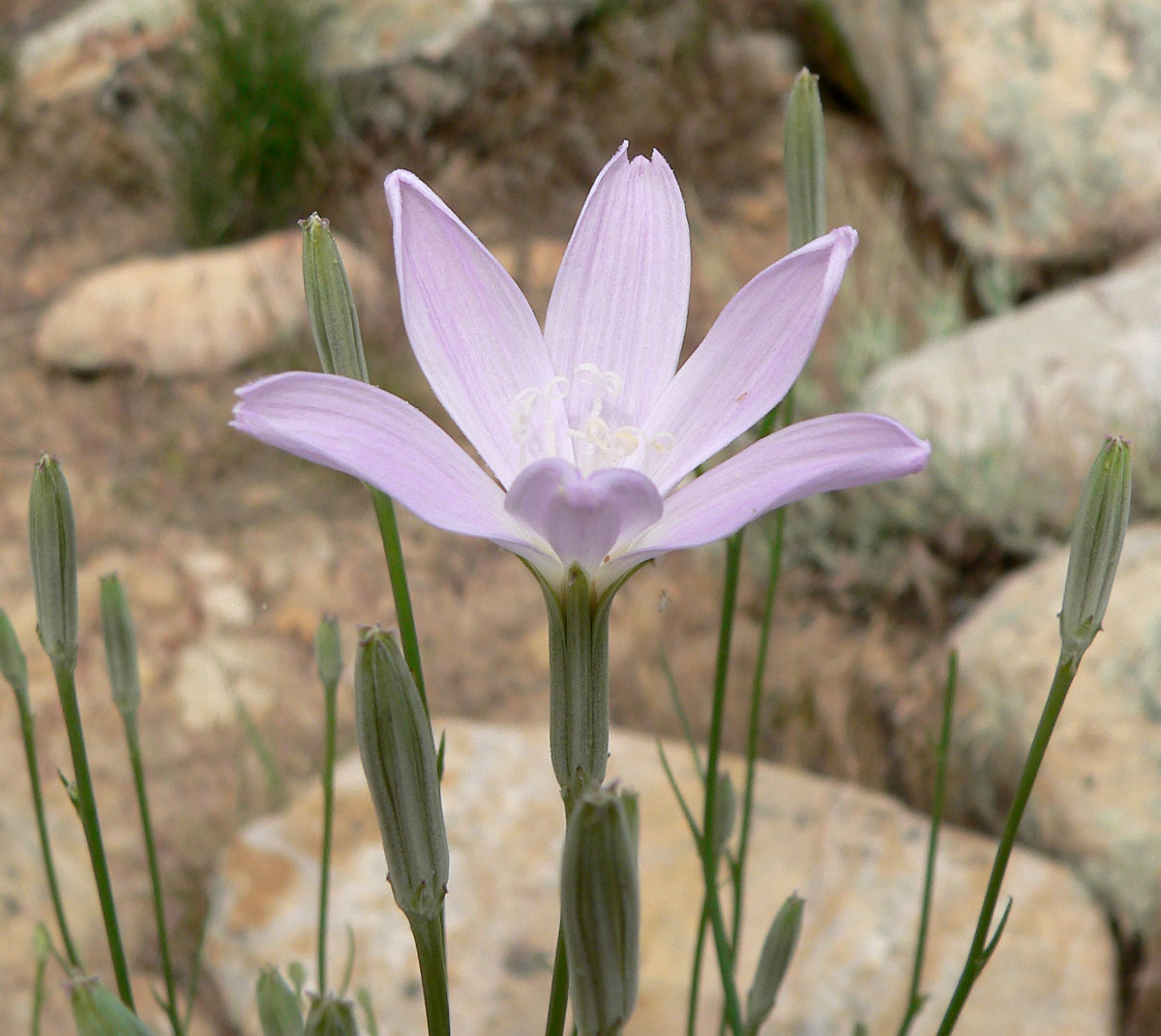
- Lygodesmia grandiflora

Scientific classification
- Kingdom: Plantae
- Clade: Tracheophytes
- Clade: Angiosperms
- Clade: Eudicots
- Clade: Asterids
- Order: Asterales
- Family: Asteraceae
- Subfamily: Cichorioideae
- Tribe: Cichorieae
- Subtribe: Microseridinae
- Genus: Lygodesmia; D.Don

Type species
- Prenanthes juncea Pursh

Synonyms
- Erythremia Nutt.

= Lygodesmia =

Genus of flowering plants

Lygodesmia, called skeletonplant, is a genus of North American flowering plants in the tribe Cichorieae within the family Asteraceae.

The name derives from the Greek lygos, a pliant twig, and desme, a bundle, because of the fascicled twiggy or rush-like stems of the plants.

Species

- Lygodesmia aphylla - FL GA AL
- Lygodesmia arizonica - AZ NM CO UT
- Lygodesmia dianthopsis - AZ UT NV ID
- Lygodesmia doloresensis - CO UT
- Lygodesmia entrada - UT
- Lygodesmia grandiflora - AZ NM CO UT WY
- Lygodesmia juncea - widespread across western Canada + western United States
- Lygodesmia ramosissima - AZ TX Chihuahua, Durango, Sonora
- Lygodesmia texana - TX OK NM Coahuila, Nuevo León
