= Atlantic coastal plain upland longleaf pine woodland =

Ecological region of southeastern US

The Atlantic coastal plain upland longleaf pine woodland is plant community found on the southern Atlantic coastal plain, in the states of southern Virginia, North Carolina, South Carolina, Georgia and northeastern Florida.

These woodlands are dominated by longleaf pine (Pinus palustris) and occur on uplands and on the higher parts of upland-wetland mosaics. They are subject to frequent fires. Soils are well- to excessively drained. Scrub oaks such as turkey oak (Quercus laevis) and bluejack oak (Quercus incana) are often in the understory. The herbaceous layer is dominated by grasses, particularly wiregrass: (Aristida stricta) in the north and (Aristida beyrichiana) in the south. These woodlands may once have been the most widespread plant community within their range.

== See also ==
- Florida longleaf pine sandhill
