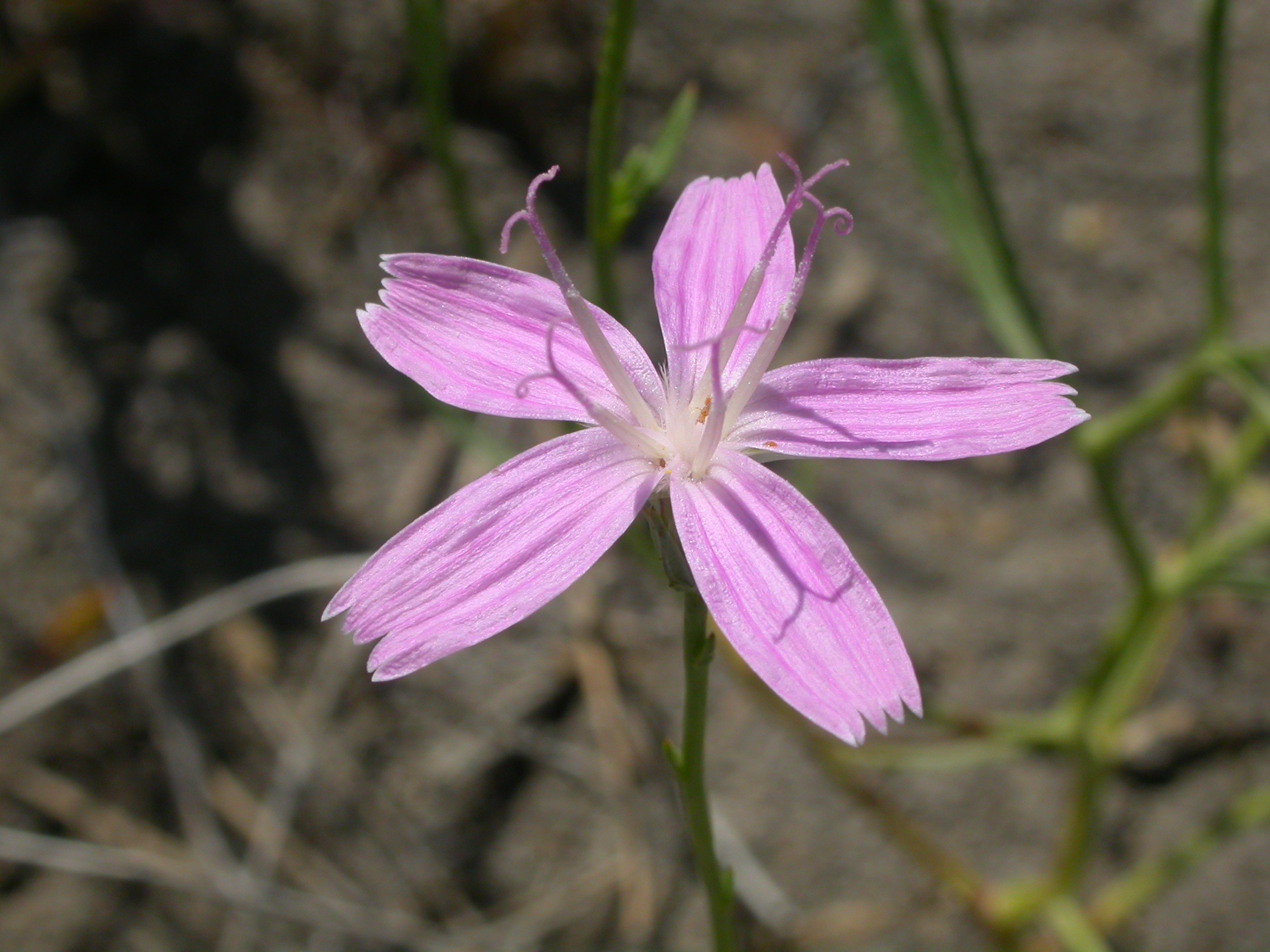
- Close-up of flower

Conservation status
- Secure (NatureServe)

Scientific classification
- Kingdom: Plantae
- Clade: Tracheophytes
- Clade: Angiosperms
- Clade: Eudicots
- Clade: Asterids
- Order: Asterales
- Family: Asteraceae
- Genus: Lygodesmia
- Species: L. juncea

Binomial name
- Lygodesmia juncea (Pursh) D.Don ex Hook.

Synonyms
- Lygodesmia juncea D.Don; Lygodesmia juncea var. racemosa Lunell; Prenanthes juncea Pursh

= Lygodesmia juncea =

Species of flowering plant

Lygodesmia juncea, the rush skeletonplant or just skeletonweed, is a species of flowering plant in the family Asteraceae, native to the western and central United States and western Canada. Widespread and considered somewhat weedy, it is adapted to blowing or otherwise disturbed soils, but not to fire. It is a perennial herb. Petals are pink or violet in color and flowers bloom June to September.
