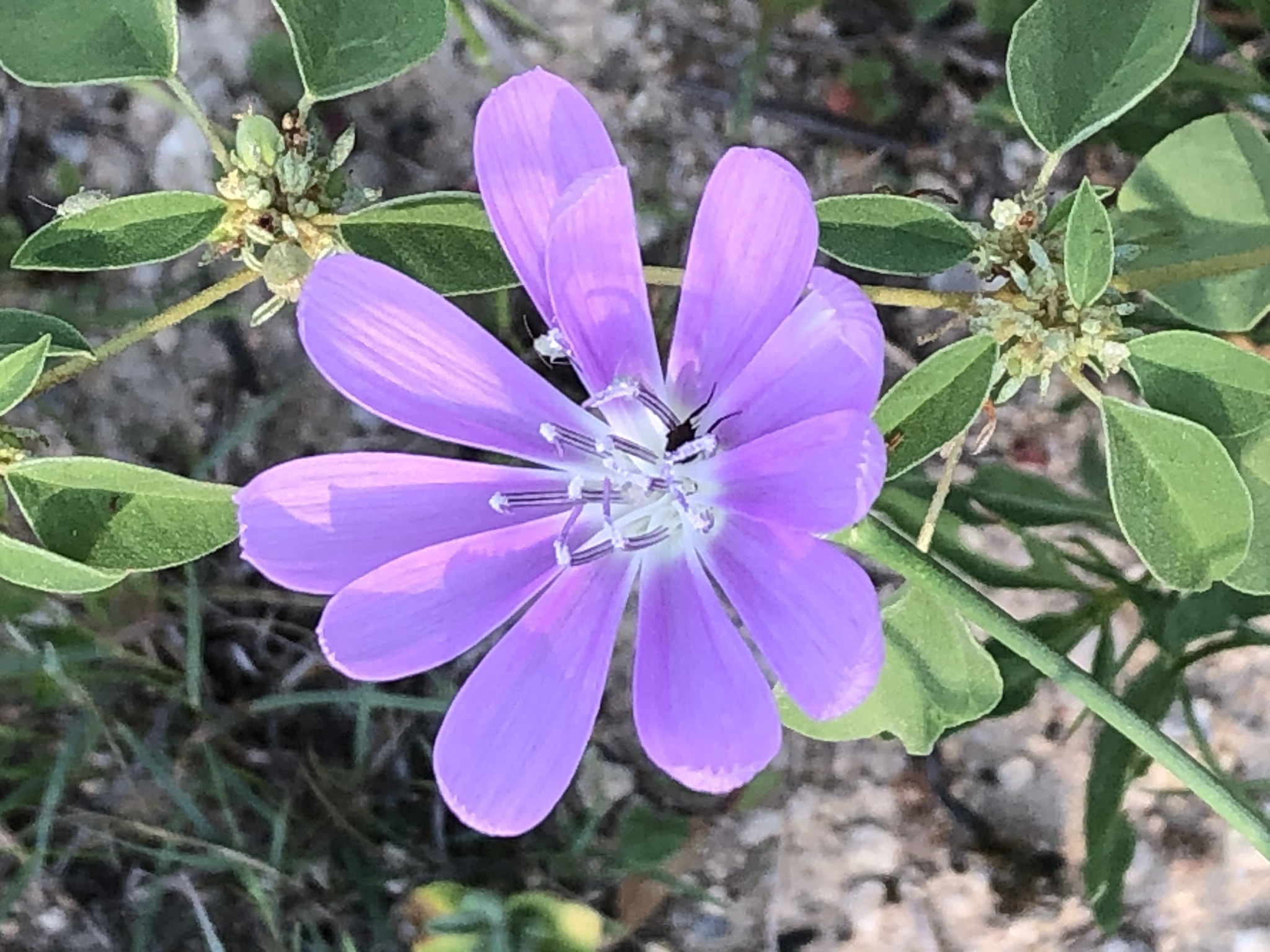
- Close-up of flower

Conservation status
- Secure (NatureServe)

Scientific classification
- Kingdom: Plantae
- Clade: Tracheophytes
- Clade: Angiosperms
- Clade: Eudicots
- Clade: Asterids
- Order: Asterales
- Family: Asteraceae
- Genus: Lygodesmia
- Species: L. texana

Binomial name
- Lygodesmia texana (Torr. & A.Gray) Greene ex Small

Synonyms
- Lygodesmia aphylla var. texana Torr. & A.Gray

= Lygodesmia texana =

Species of plant

Lygodesmia texana, the Texas skeleton plant, is a species of flowering plant in the family Asteraceae, native to the US states of New Mexico, Texas, and Oklahoma, and to northeastern Mexico. A perennial reaching at most 2 ft (60 cm), it prefers to grow on well-drained limestone soil and blooms from April to August.

== Description ==
The Texas skeleton plant has a wide, light purple flower at the end of a thin and leafless stem, typically 12-24 inches in height. The base of the plant has a handful of small leaves. Only one flower blooms at the end of each stem at a time, and it features 8-12 light purple petals with a white center. The stems bleed sap when broken which can form into a gum.

== Name origin ==
The common name derives from the bare, leafless stem that grows at odd angles, resembling something skeletal. Other names include Texas skeleton weed, purple dandelion, and flowering straw.
