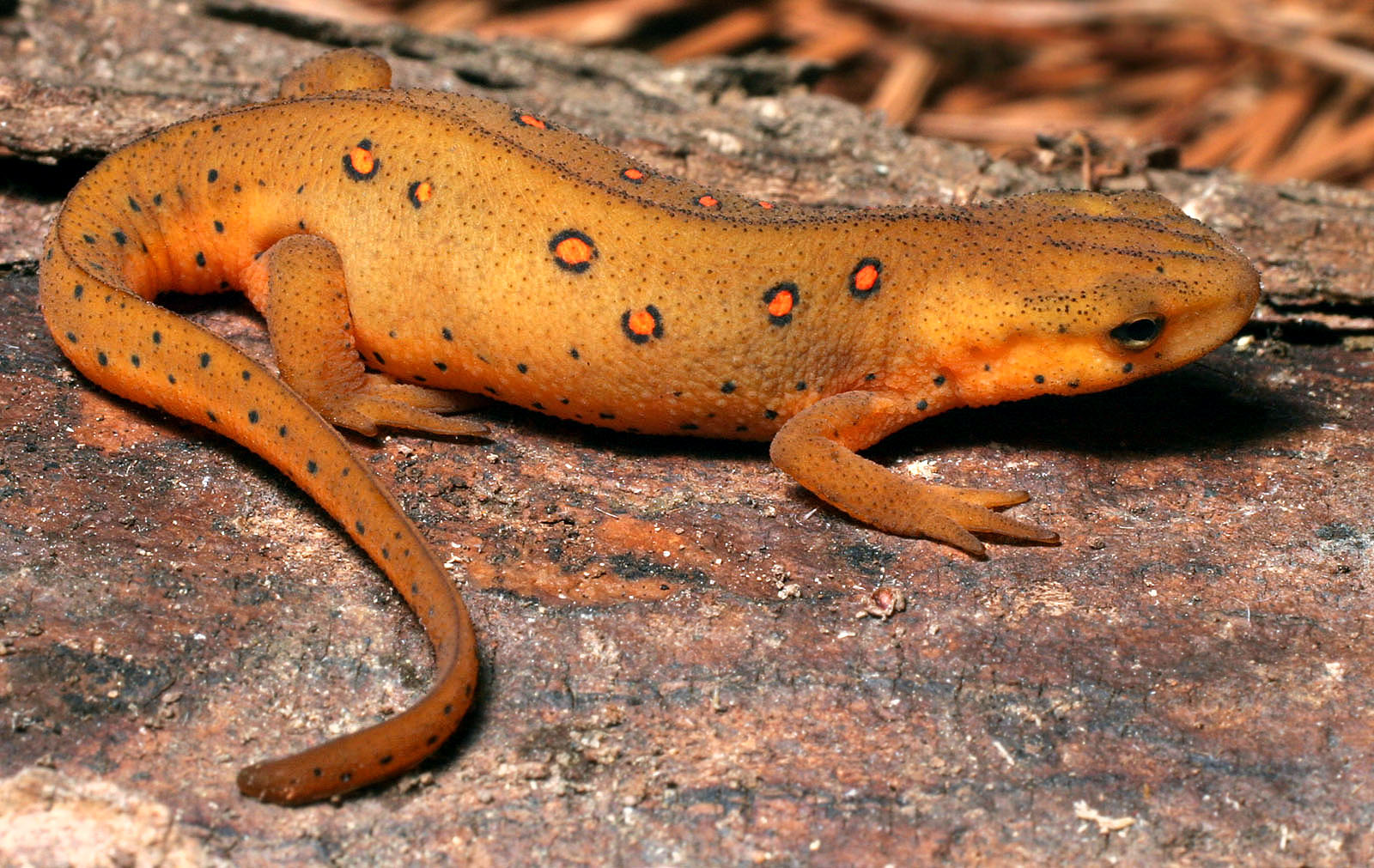
- Notophthalmus viridescens

Scientific classification
- Kingdom: Animalia
- Phylum: Chordata
- Class: Amphibia
- Order: Urodela
- Family: Salamandridae
- Subfamily: Pleurodelinae
- Genus: Notophthalmus; Rafinesque, 1820

Type species
- Notophthalmus viridescens

Synonyms
- Diemictylus?

= Notophthalmus =

Genus of amphibians

Notophthalmus is a genus of newts. There are three species. The name derives from Greek νῶτον (nōton), meaning "back", and Greek ὀφθαλμός (ophthalmos), meaning "eye".

== Description ==
Notophthalmus species are East American newts similar in shape to the European newts (cf. Triturus). As a distinct characteristic of their own, both sexes have three to four large pores that lie in a row on the temple. The skin is smooth and soft in the water form and the tail is strongly flattened laterally. The back bar, on the other hand, is only narrow. Especially during the mating season, there is a clear sexual dimorphism: the males have very strong rut callosities consisting of 10 to 12 horn platelets on the inside of the hind legs, a strongly thickened tail as well as horny toe tips and a spherically arched cloaca. The latter is truncated conical in the females.

== Species ==
Species recognized as of October 2019:

image	Scientific name	Common name	Distribution
	Notophthalmus meridionalis (Cope, 1880)	black-spotted newt	northeastern Mexico and southern Texas
	Notophthalmus perstriatus (Bishop, 1941)	striped newt	southern Georgia southward into central Florida
	Notophthalmus viridescens (Rafinesque, 1820)	eastern newt	eastern North America
