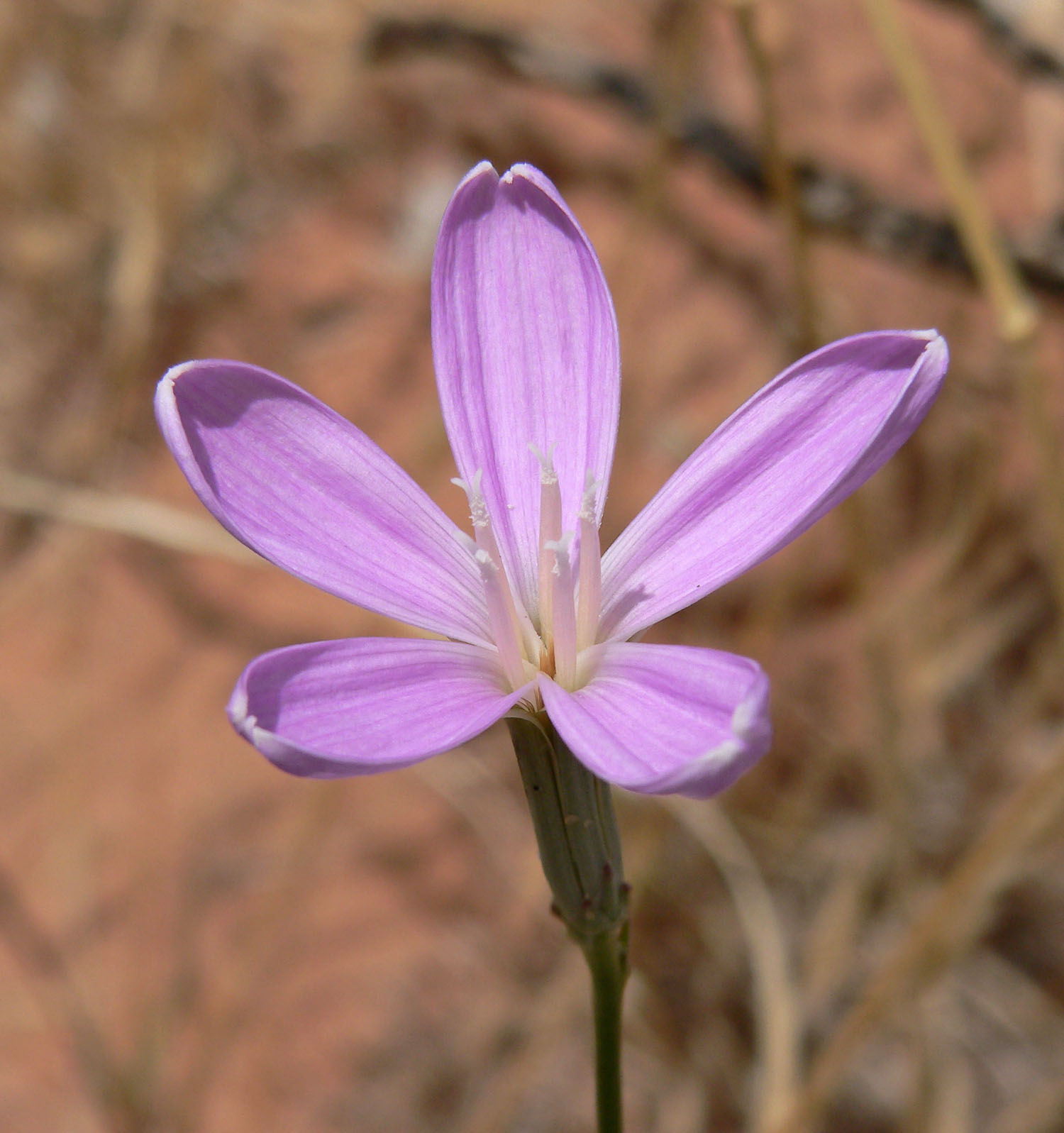
- Lygodesmia grandiflora var. dianthopsis

Conservation status
- Apparently Secure (NatureServe)

Scientific classification
- Kingdom: Plantae
- Clade: Tracheophytes
- Clade: Angiosperms
- Clade: Eudicots
- Clade: Asterids
- Order: Asterales
- Family: Asteraceae
- Genus: Lygodesmia
- Species: L. grandiflora

Binomial name
- Lygodesmia grandiflora (Nutt.) Torr. & A.Gray

= Lygodesmia grandiflora =

Species of flowering plant

Lygodesmia grandiflora, the largeflower skeletonplant or showy rushpink, is a perennial plant in the family Asteraceae found in the Colorado Plateau and Canyonlands region of the southwestern United States.

The plant grows up to 10–30 centimeters (4–12 in) tall. Its stems are thin and flexuous. The narrow leaves are larger towards the base. The stem bears one or sometimes a few flower heads, which have 6–15 pink to bluish rays about 4 cm (1 1/2 in) long. Unusually for its family, it has no disc florets. It flowers early in summer.
