= Sandhill =

Type of ecological community or xeric wildfire-maintained ecosystem

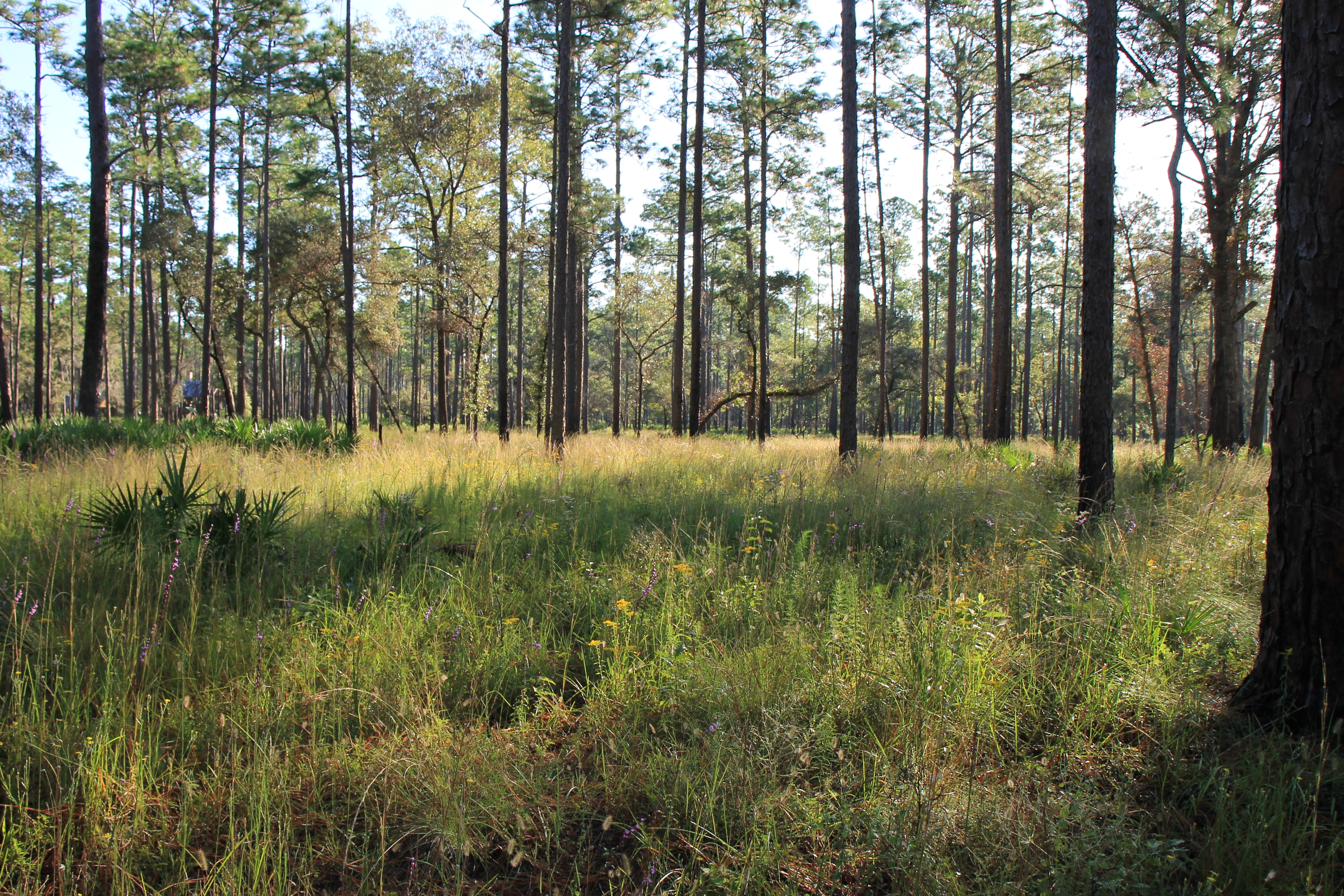
Fire maintained sandhill community at Austin Cary Forest, near Gainesville, FL

A sandhill is a type of ecological community or xeric wildfire-maintained ecosystem. It is not the same as a sand dune. It features very short fire return intervals, one to five years. Without fire, sandhills undergo ecological succession and become more oak dominated.

Entisols are the typical sandhill soil, deep well-drained and nutrient poor. In Florida, sandhills receive 130 cm (51 in) of rainfall per year, just like the more hydric ecosystems surrounding them. Sandhills are xeric because they have poor water holding capacity.

Dominant vegetation includes longleaf pine (Pinus palustris), American turkey oak (Quercus laevis), and wiregrass (Aristida stricta). A number of rare animals are typical of this habitat including the gopher tortoise (Gopherus polyphemus), red-cockaded woodpecker (Picoides borealis), Sherman's fox squirrel (Sciurus niger shermani), and striped newt (Notophthalmus perstriatus). Invasive species that are a problem on sandhills include Cogongrass (Imperata cylindrica), camphor laurels (Cinnamomum camphora), and Natal grass (Melinis repens).

== See also ==
- Athabasca Sand Dunes Provincial Park – Provincial park in Saskatchewan, Canada
- Flatwoods – Ecological community in the southeastern coastal plain of North America, another ecological community in the coastal plain of North America
- Florida longleaf pine sandhill – Ecological region of Florida, US
- Monahans Sandhills State Park – State park in Texas, United States
- Nebraska Sand Hills – Temperate grasslands, savannas, and shrublands ecoregion of Nebraska, United States
