= Florida longleaf pine sandhill =

Ecological region of Florida, US

The Florida longleaf pine sandhill is a forest system found on sandhills in the coastal plains of northern Florida, ranging from the panhandle to the central peninsula. Particular examples can be found in Ocala National Forest, Withlacoochee State Forest, Mike Roess Gold Head Branch State Park, and Eglin Air Force Base.

These forests consist of stands of longleaf pine (Pinus palustris) on very well-drained, sandy hills. The stands are maintained by frequent fires. Turkey oak (Quercus laevis), myrtle oak (Quercus myrtifolia), and gopher apple (Licania michauxii) are common in the understory; wiregrass (Aristida beyrichiana) makes up the ground layer.

== See also ==
- Atlantic coastal plain upland longleaf pine woodland
