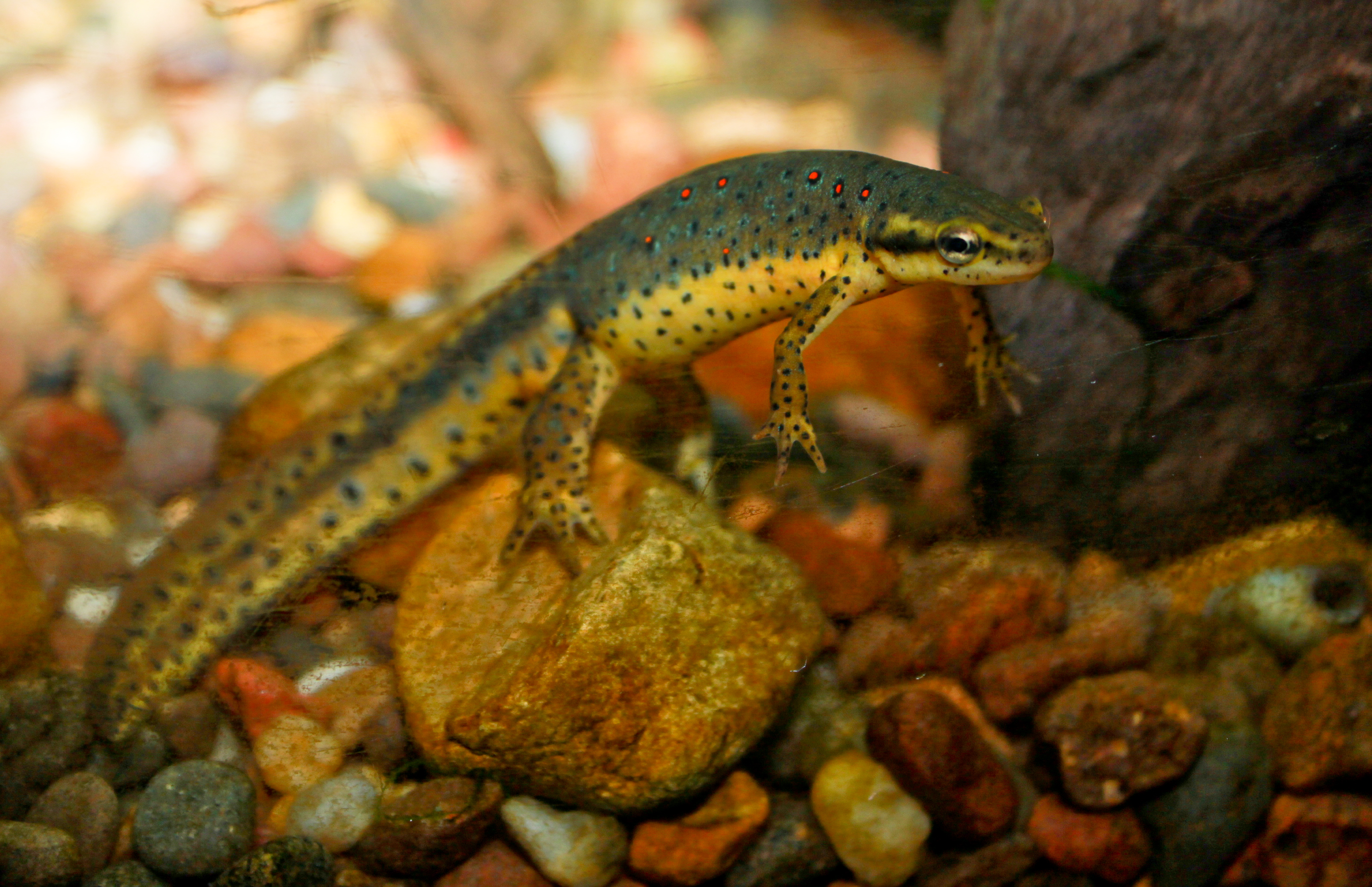
- Aquatic adult male

Conservation status
- Least Concern (IUCN 3.1)

- Secure (NatureServe)

Scientific classification
- Kingdom: Animalia
- Phylum: Chordata
- Class: Amphibia
- Order: Urodela
- Family: Salamandridae
- Genus: Notophthalmus
- Species: N. viridescens

Binomial name
- Notophthalmus viridescens (Rafinesque, 1820)
- Range of N. viridescens subspecies: Yellow: N. v. viridescens Purple: N. v. louisianensis Magenta: N. v. dorsalis Black: N. v. piaropicola

= Eastern newt =

Species of amphibian

The eastern newt (Notophthalmus viridescens) is a common newt of eastern North America. It frequents small lakes, ponds, vernal ponds and streams or nearby wooded areas. The eastern newt produces tetrodotoxin, which makes the species unpalatable to predatory fish and crayfish. It has a lifespan of 12 to 15 years in the wild, and it may grow to 5 in (13 cm) in length. These animals are common aquarium pets, being either collected from the wild or sold commercially. The striking bright orange juvenile stage, which is land-dwelling, is known as a red eft. Some sources blend the general name of the species and that of the red-spotted newt subspecies into the eastern red-spotted newt (although there is no "western" one).

== Subspecies ==
The eastern newt includes these four subspecies:

- Red-spotted newt (Notophthalmus viridescens viridescens);
- Broken-striped newt (Notophthalmus viridescens dorsalis);
- Central newt (Notophthalmus viridescens louisianensis) - Central newts measure from 2.5 in (6.4 cm) to 4 in (10 cm) in length. They are brown or green, with fine black dots all over the body. There may be a row of red spots on each side of the body. The belly is yellow or orange and is noticeably lighter than the rest of the body. The skin of newts is not as slippery as the skin of salamanders and may appear to be rough and dry for parts of their lives;
- Peninsula newt (Notophthalmus viridescens piaropicola).

== Life stages ==
Little is known about the terrestrial portion of the Eastern Newt's lifecycle due to their small size and behavior. Eastern newts have a lifespan of about 7–10 years in the wild, but some individuals have been known to live up to 15 years. Eastern newts have three stages of life: (1) the aquatic larva or tadpole, (2) the red eft or terrestrial juvenile stage, and (3) the aquatic adult.

=== Larva ===
The larva stage is a period of 2 to 5 months. The larva possesses gills and does not leave the pond environment where it was hatched. Larvae are brown-green, and shed their gills when they transform into the red eft. The larval Eastern Newt is the most heavily preyed upon stage. They are commonly predated on by fish, aquatic insects, and other adult newts, leading to high mortality.

=== Red eft ===
The red eft (juvenile) stage is a bright orangish-red, with darker red spots outlined in black. An eastern newt can have as many as 21 of these spots. The pattern of these spots differs among the subspecies. An eastern newt's time to get from larva to eft is about three months. During this stage, the eft may travel far, acting as a dispersal stage from one pond to another, ensuring outcrossing in the population. The striking coloration of this stage is an example of aposematism — or "warning coloration" — which is a type of antipredator adaptation in which a "warning signal" is associated with the unprofitability of a prey item (i.e., the saturation of the eft's tissues with tetrodotoxin) to potential predators. Their tetrodotoxin is a neurotoxin which is also the strongest emetic that is known. Sometimes the juvenile will continue its aquatic existence also after metamorphosis.

=== Adult ===
After two or three years, the eft finds a pond and transforms into the aquatic adult. The adult's skin is a dull olive green dorsally, with a dull yellow belly, but retains the eft's characteristic black-rimmed red spots. It develops a larger, blade-like tail and characteristically slimy skin.

It is common for the peninsula newt (N. v. piaropicola) to be neotenic, with a larva transforming directly into a sexually mature aquatic adult, never losing its external gills. The red eft stage is in these cases skipped.

== Habitat ==
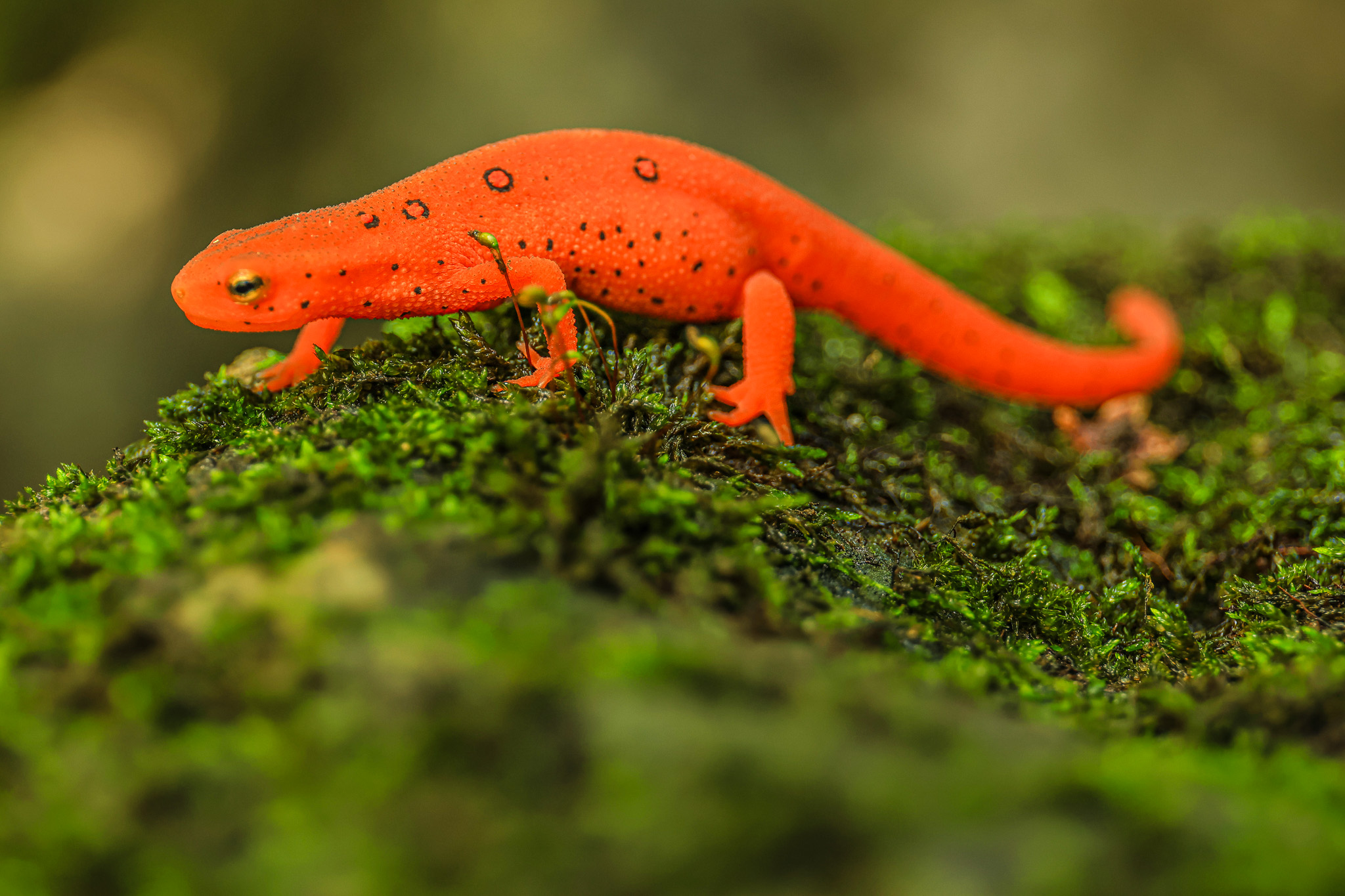
Red Eft seen on a moss-covered rock near a creek in Crossville, Tennessee

Eastern newts are at home in both coniferous and deciduous forests. Habitat preferences include shallow water, quiet stretches of streams, swamps or ditches, lakes and ponds with heavy submerged vegetation. and nearby damp woodlands. They need a moist environment with either a temporary or permanent body of water, and thrive best in a muddy environment. Eastern newts have a preference for certain types of habitats, with males preferring more open, aquatic habitats and females preferring more forested, terrestrial habitats. This preference may be related to the different roles that males and females play in the reproductive process, with males typically being more active in courtship and females spending more time on land preparing to lay eggs.

Eastern newts may travel far from their original location during the eft stage. They are most active during warm rainy periods—warmer than 53 °F (12 °C)—and will hide under leaf litter in dry weather. Red efts may often be seen in a forest after a rainstorm. Adults prefer a muddy aquatic habitat, but will move to land during a dry spell. Eastern newts have some amount of toxins in their skin, which is brightly colored to act as a warning. Even then, only 2% of larvae make it to the eft stage. Some larvae have been found in the pitchers of the carnivorous plant Sarracenia purpurea.

Emergence and continued movement are promoted by a moist surface environment. Newts are frequently observed near the surface using forest litter with very few using subterranean habitats.

== Diet ==
Eastern newts are carnivorous, feeding on a variety of prey every two to three days. As larvae, they feed on small aquatic invertebrates, and as adults, they eat insects, worms, snails, and other small invertebrates. Eastern newts eat a variety of prey, such as insects, springtails, soil mites, small mollusks and crustaceans, young amphibians, worms, and frog eggs. They also eat a lot of snails, beetles, ants, and mosquito larvae, with an annual ingestion of about 35,000 kcal. Their dietary habits prove to be beneficial to humans because they help to control insect populations and maintain balance to their habitats. Eastern newts are a vital part of many ecosystems, serving as both predators and prey.

== Behavior ==
Studies have found that both juvenile and adult Eastern Newts are capable of travelling long distances over terrestrial terrain in a relatively short period of time. Eastern newts have a number of natural predators, including fish, snakes, birds, and larger salamanders. They have several defenses against these predators, including their bright coloring, which serves as a warning signal, and their ability to secrete toxins from their skin as a defense mechanism. Weather patterns are found to influence movement patterns more than intrinsic traits.

=== Adaptability ===
Eastern newts are highly sensitive to changes in their environment and are able to detect and respond to changes in water quality and temperature. They will follow the thermoclines of their habitats as it changes with the seasons.This sensitivity allows them to thrive in a variety of habitats, but it also makes them vulnerable to environmental changes and pollution. In fact, eastern newts are considered a sensitive species, meaning that they are often used as indicators of ecosystem health. When populations of eastern newts decline, it can be a sign of environmental stress or degradation. Newt populations are threatened by deforestation, habitat fragmentation, and pollution. Adults display adaptability in habitat selection by either remaining aquatic or coming back to terrestrial habitats after reproduction.

=== Hibernation ===
Eastern newts are ectothermic, relying on external sources of heat to regulate their body temperature. They are most active during the warmer months of the year, but they can also be found in more temperate climates where they may be active year-round. Eastern Newts have showcased a resistance to a wide variety of temperatures, altering their body chemistry and being able to survive and breed even under ice in winter conditions. During the winter months, some eastern newts will often burrow underground or seek shelter in logs or other debris to avoid the cold. However, studies have shown that some do not engage in hibernation, depending on the location of the species.

=== Homing ===
Eastern newts home using magnetic orientation. Their magnetoreception system seems to be a hybrid of polarity-based inclination and a sun-dependent compass. Shoreward-bound eastern newts will orient themselves quite differently under light with wavelengths around 400 nm than light with wavelengths around 600 nm, while homing newts will orient themselves the same way under both short and long wavelengths. Ferromagnetic material, probably biogenic magnetite, is likely present in the eastern newt's body.

A study determined that the home range size for Eastern newts is primarily affected by food availability, substrate humidity, but not affected by dispersal ability, competition, shelter availability, or predator avoidance. Distance traveled depended on humidity and precipitation. The mean distance traveled overnight was about 15 m, with longest trails ranging over 70 m.

=== Reproduction ===
Eastern newts breed once per year, when breeding starts in late fall until early spring. They are known to be polygynandrous, with females and males mating with multiple partners. Males have preference towards larger females, while no evidence for female preference during mating was found. The breeding migration often happens more with rainfall. The male's spots attract females, luring them to him with fanning motions of his tail, causing a pheromone to be released. Once the male enters breeding season, he will develop a deeply keeled tail and visible bumps on the inside of his thigh.Once the female has chosen a mate, the male will deposit a spermatophore, a package of sperm, onto the ground, which the female will then pick up and fertilize her eggs with, after a period of storage potentially lasting upwards of 10 months. The female will lay her eggs in the water, attaching them to submerged vegetation or other objects. 200–400 eggs are laid in a single batch, with incubation period of 3–8 weeks. For the normal and healthy development of gonads, fat-bodies are needed in proximity of the developing organs to ensure proper reproduction ability.

=== Social interactions ===
The behavior of eastern newts is also influenced by their social interactions with other members of their species. Eastern newts exhibit social hierarchy, with dominant individuals exhibiting aggressive behaviors towards subordinates. This social hierarchy is thought to be related to the distribution of resources, with dominant individuals having access to more food and better mating opportunities. One such behavior is territoriality, where individuals will defend a specific area or resource from other members of their species. This behavior is commonly seen in males during the breeding season, when they will defend a territory in order to attract females and ensure access to mating opportunities.

== Survival advantages ==
Secretion of toxins through the skin protects the newt from predators, and should therefore not be handled with bare hands. The red colors of the adult newt also act as a warning sign for predators. Its ventral surface has poison glands, which makes predators reluctant to eat it. However, one study observed a Belted Kingfisher (Megaceryle alcyon) beat an eastern newt on a nest box 15 times before eating it. This special toxin is known as tetrodotoxin. Several studies have found that newt larvae increase the production of this toxin while in the presence of predators (dragonflies). Tetrodotoxin is known to cause muscle paralysis, skin irritation, and even death in predators, although some mantis species have shown a resilience to this toxin, and predatory sunfish are not deterred by the toxin. The Eastern newt also has a greater tail depth and is capable of swimming quickly away from aquatic predators.

== Limb regeneration ==
Eastern newts are able to regenerate their limbs that were lost to an injury. Forelimb regeneration has been considered to be close to the forelimb development; genes that play a role in forelimb regeneration are known to also be expressed in its developmental stages. In addition, they are capable of regenerating their spinal cord, heart, and other organs. This ability is thought to be related to their high levels of stem cells, which allow them to repair and regenerate damaged tissues.

== Conservation concerns ==
Although eastern newts are widespread throughout North America, they, like many other species of amphibians, are increasingly threatened by several factors including habitat fragmentation, climate change, invasive species, over-exploitation, and emergent infectious diseases. The biodiversity of amphibians across the United States is considered to be threatened due to the loss of wetlands and furthermore, their connectivity; since the 1780s, more than 53% of wetlands in the United States have been lost. For example, a study found the toxicity of coal-tar pavement on eastern newts sublethal, decreasing their righting ability and swimming speed. Wild eastern newts are known hosts of Batrachochytrium dendrobatidis and Ranavirus, as well as the mesomycetozoan Amphibiocystidium ranae This mesomycetozoan causes mortality in eastern newt populations, presenting as subcutaneous cysts, which are visible as raised bumps under the skin and in the liver. They are also highly susceptible to the newly emergent chytrid fungus Batrachochytrium salamandrivorans.

== Gallery ==
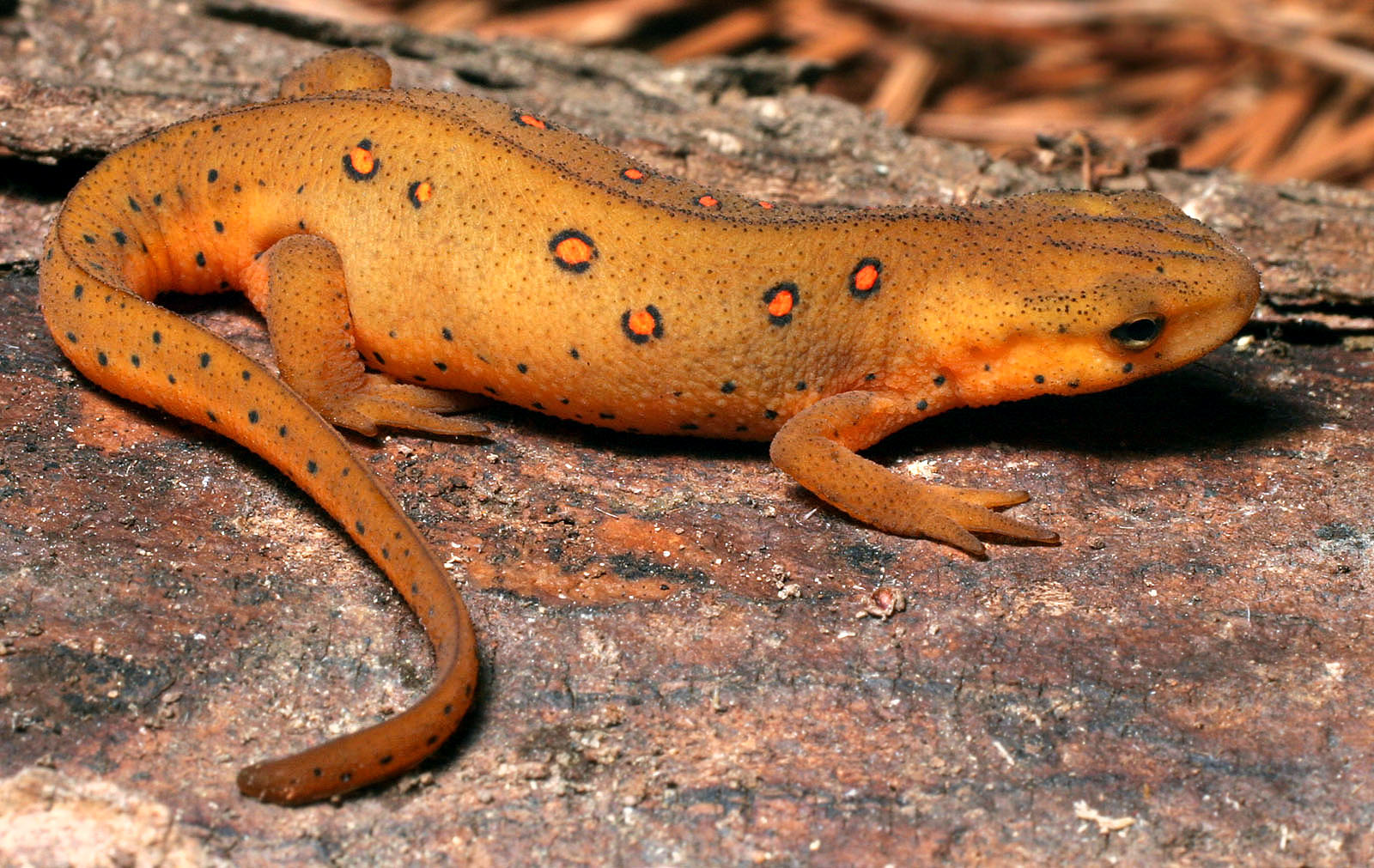
Terrestrial juvenile stage ("red eft")

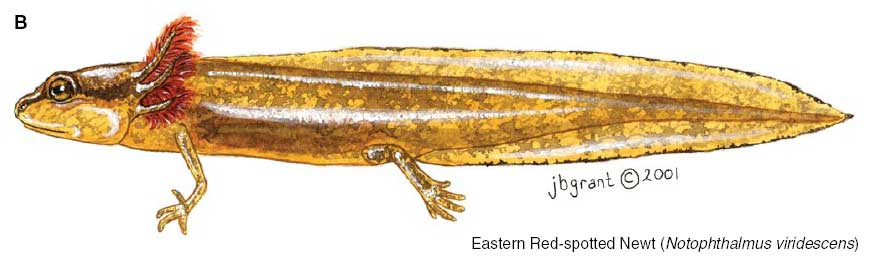
Aquatic larval stage

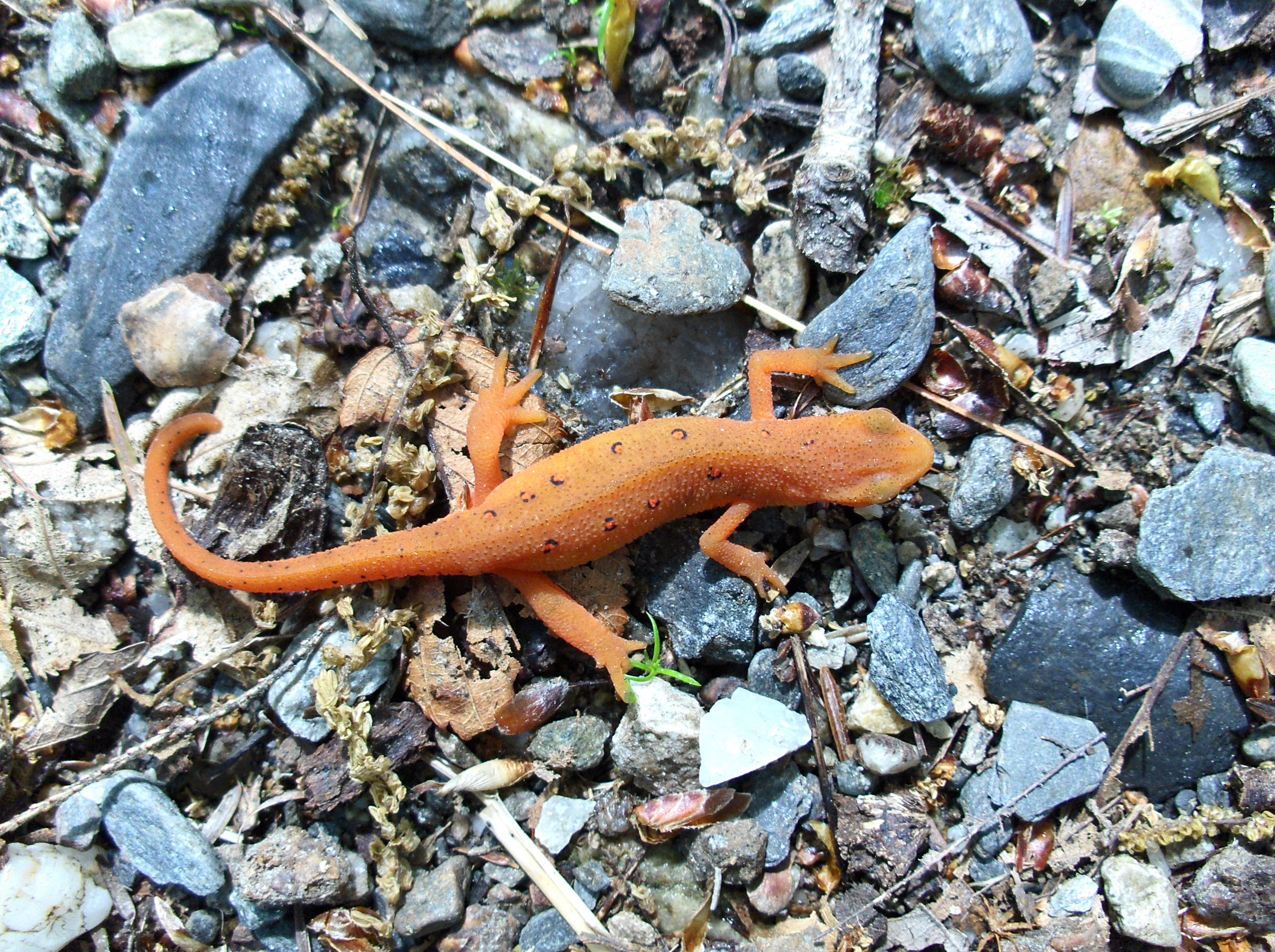
Eft near Northfield, Massachusetts

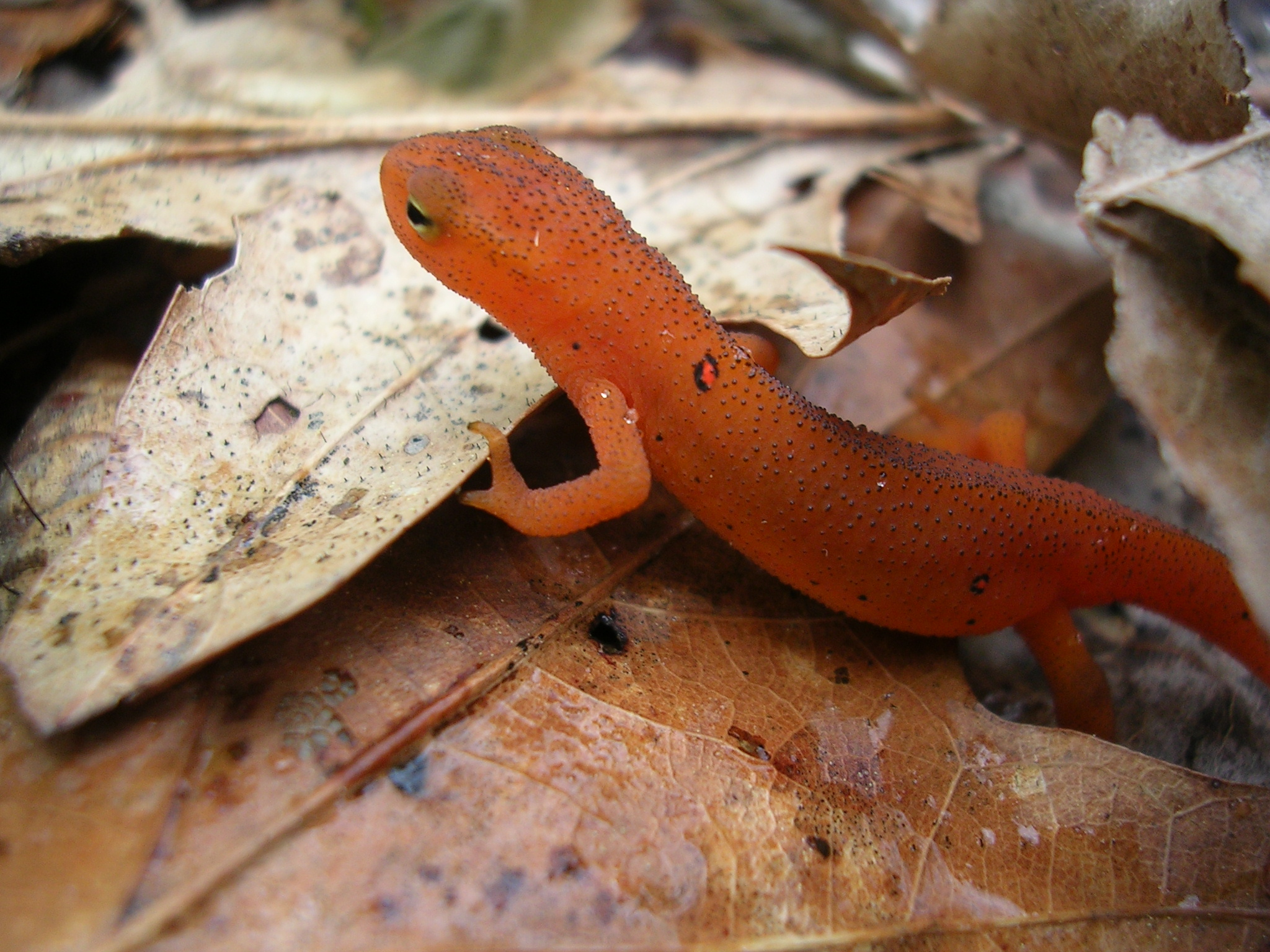
Eft navigating over leaves near Thomasville, Alabama

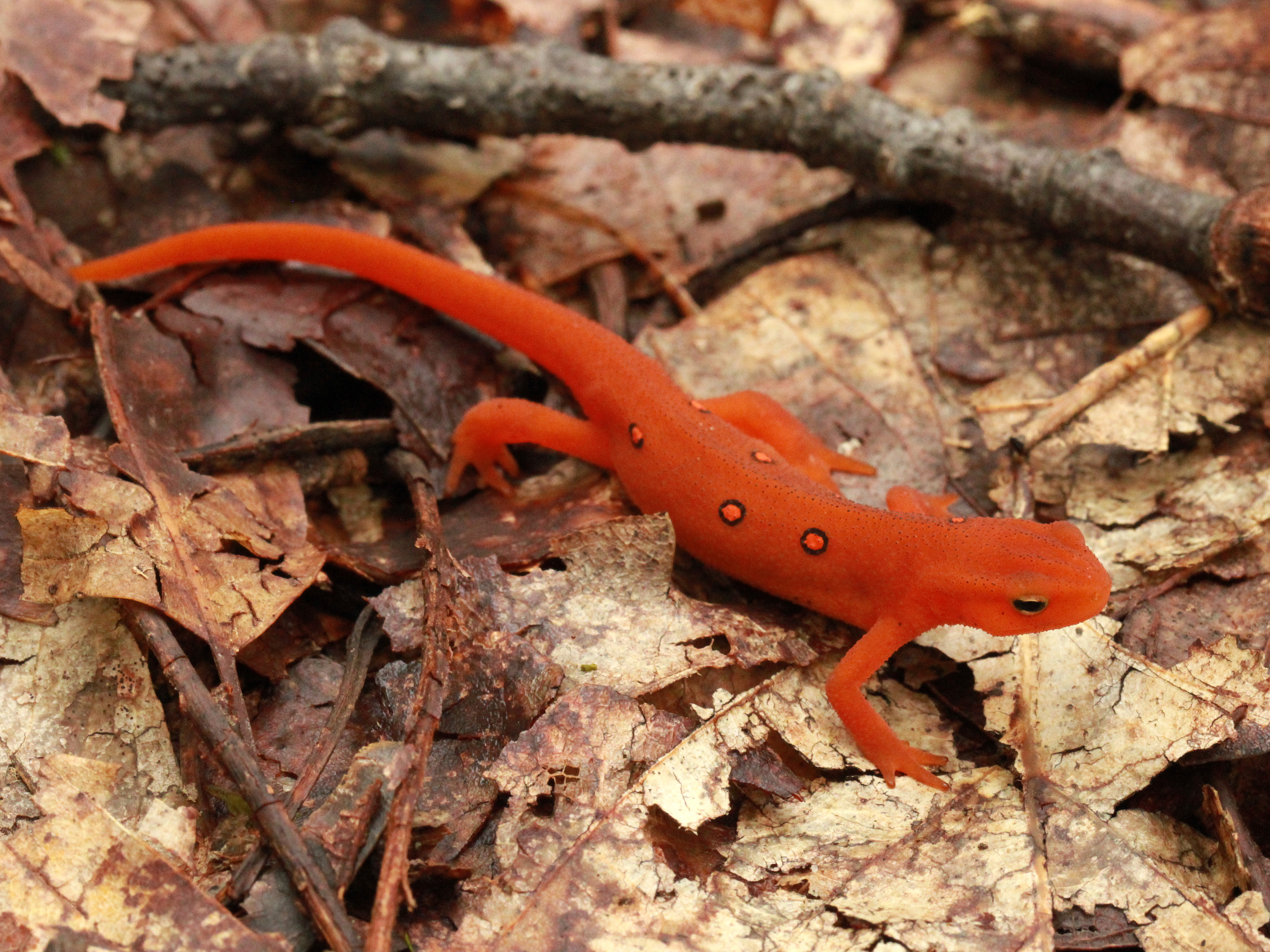
Eft on North Fork Mountain in eastern West Virginia

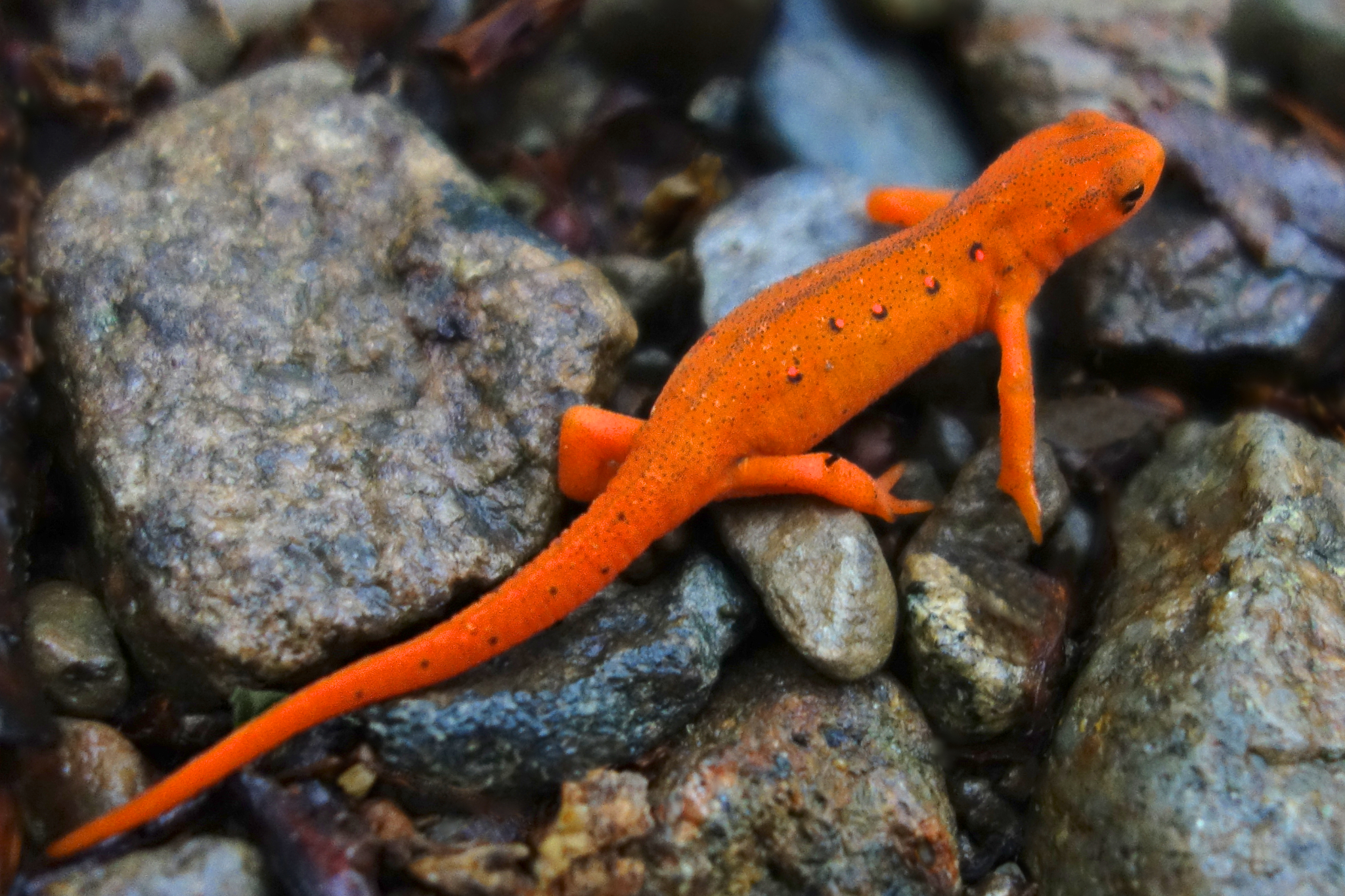
Eft seen along a trail in Harriman Park, New York

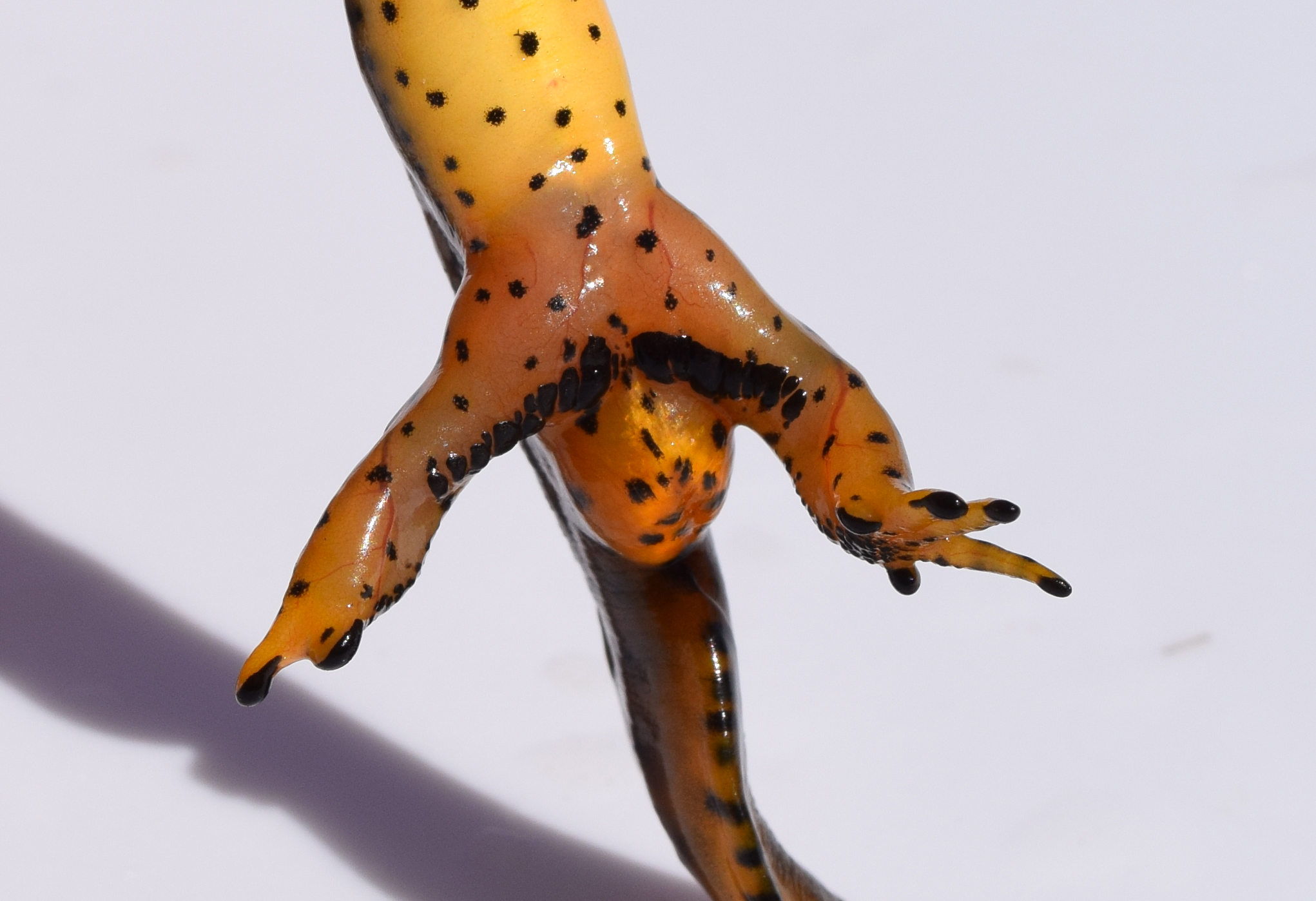
Swollen cloaca and large hind legs in a reproductive adult male

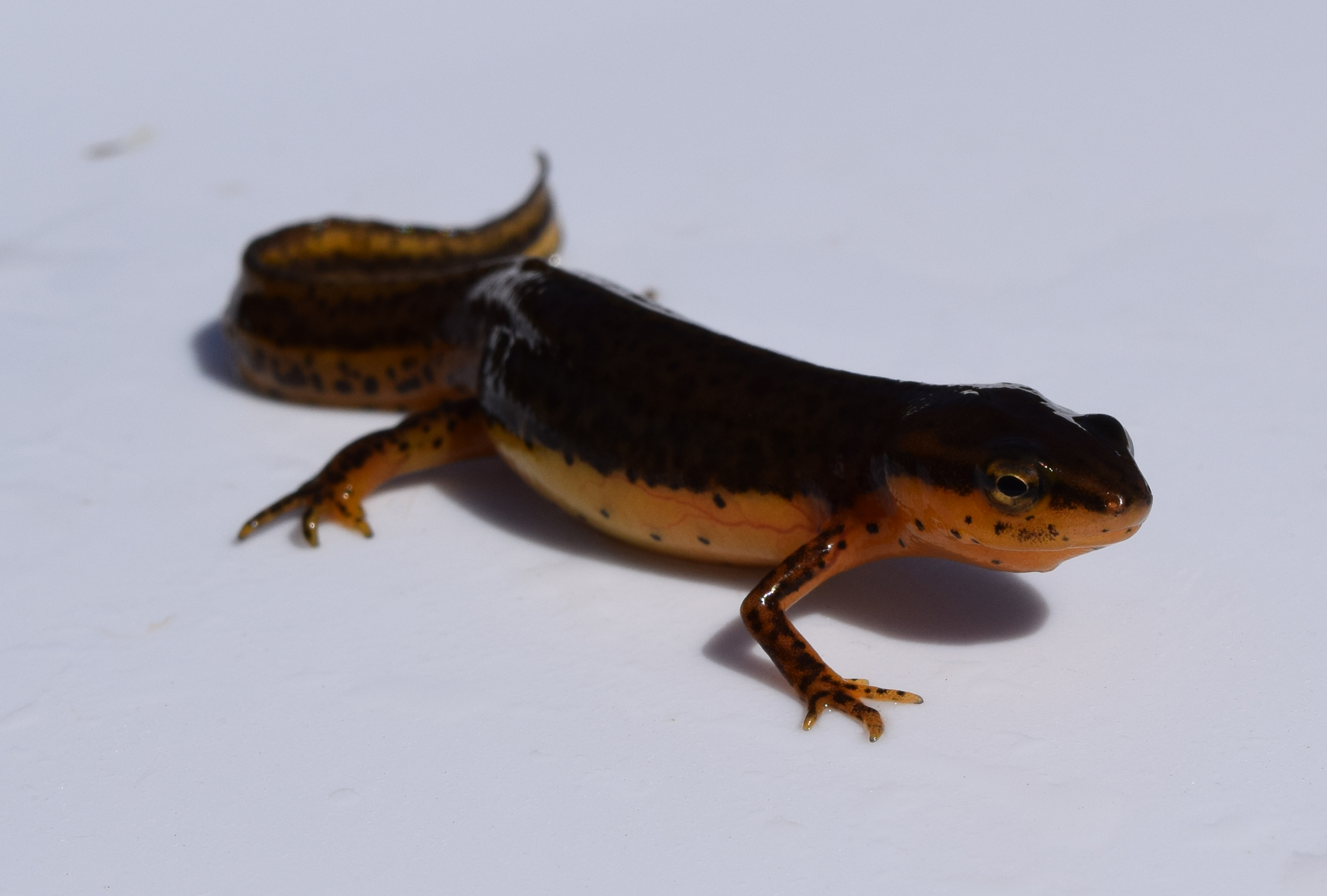
Adult female central newt

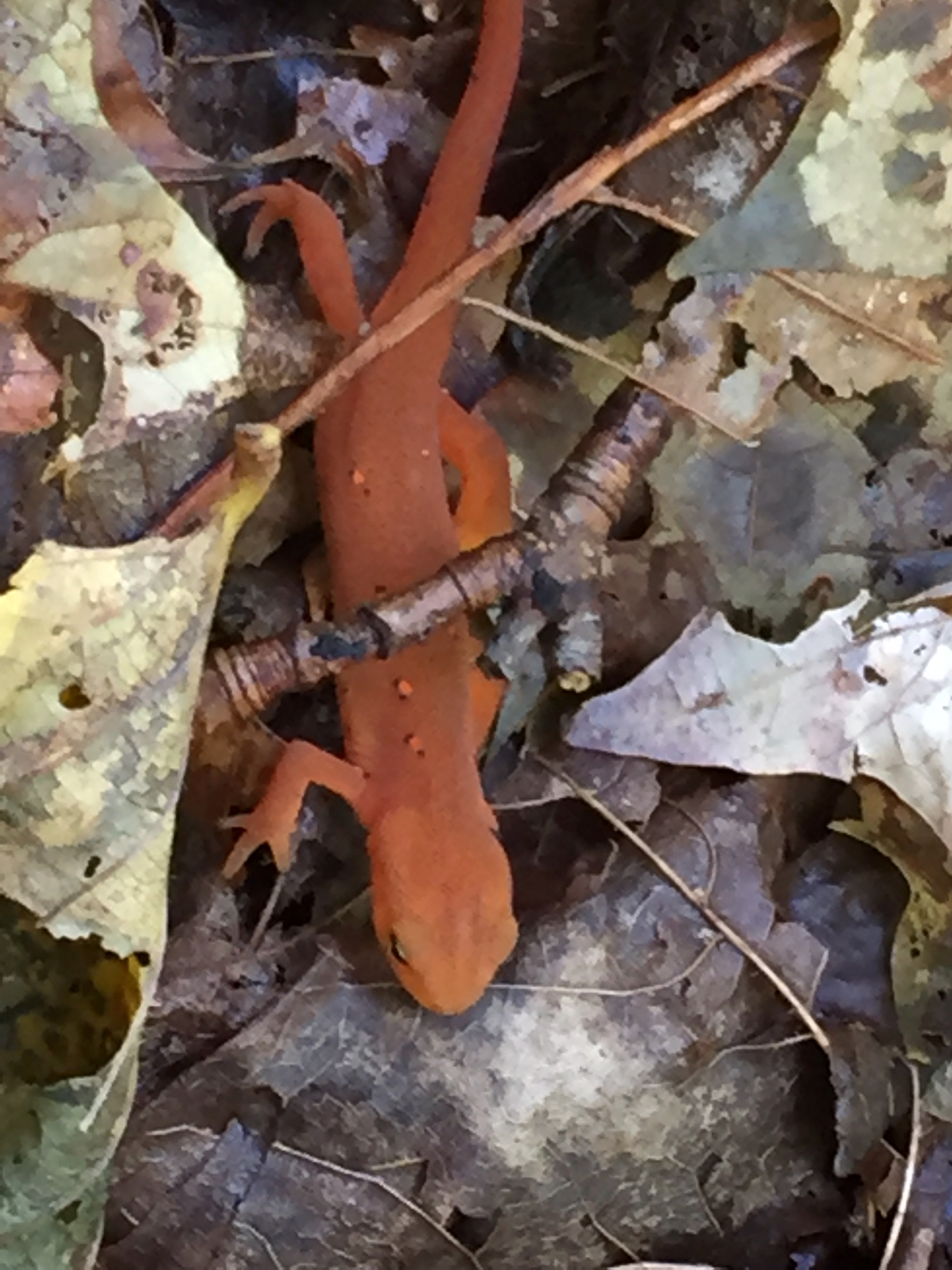
A red-spotted newt among the autumn leaves not far from Bolton, Vermont
