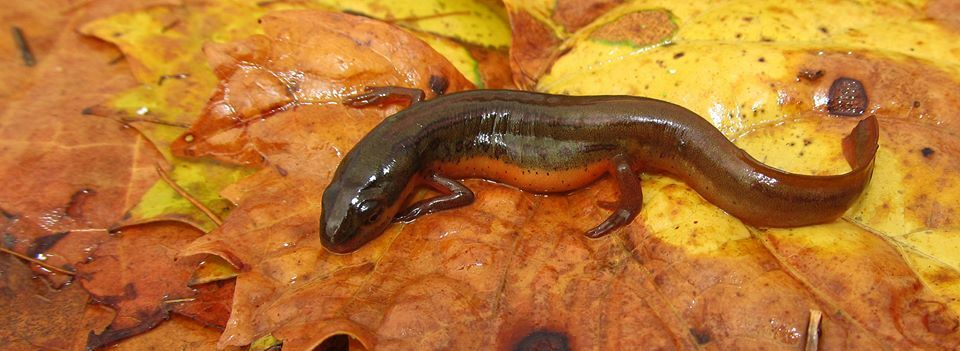
- Example from Osceola County, Florida

Conservation status
- Near Threatened (IUCN 3.1)

Scientific classification
- Kingdom: Animalia
- Phylum: Chordata
- Class: Amphibia
- Order: Urodela
- Family: Salamandridae
- Genus: Notophthalmus
- Species: N. perstriatus

Binomial name
- Notophthalmus perstriatus (Bishop, 1941)

Synonyms
- Diemictylus viridescens subsp. perstriatus (Bishop, 1941); Diemyctylus perstriatus (Bishop, 1941); Triturus perstriatus Bishop, 1941

= Striped newt =

Species of amphibian

The striped newt (Notophthalmus perstriatus) is a species of aquatic salamander native to the southeastern United States. It is a close relative of the eastern newt, with which it shares territory, and can be distinguished from the latter by the presence of red stripes running down the sides of its back and red spots on its back that lack a black outline.

== Description ==
Growing from 2.12–4.12 in (5.4–10.5 cm) in length, a fully mature striped newt is yellow-green to olive green to black-brown in color with bright red or orange parallel dorsal stripes. The underside is yellow with black spots. The aquatic larvae are tan, greenish, or brown with bushy external gills and have a distinct light lateral line and dark mottling on the large tail fin. The striped newt can also occur as an eft, which is a terrestrial juvenile stage that spends several years completely on land. Efts can be identified by their light brown or orange coloration and namesake red striping. Neoteny, or paedomorphosis, can be common in populations that live in permanent or semi-permanent fishless ponds. Neotenic adults are yellow-green to brown and often lack the red stripes seen in terrestrial forms.

== Habitat ==
This newt is found from southern Georgia southward into central Florida. It typically inhabits fire-maintained habitats with sandy soils such as longleaf pine sandhills, scrub, scrubby flatwoods, and occasionally hammock ponds, where it breeds from late winter through spring.

== Threats ==
While currently listed on the IUCN Red List as near threatened, there has been a push to relist the species as federally threatened due to population decline.

Due to human interference with fire regimes, forested pond basins are developing a thicker understory, and hardwood trees are taking over the grasslands. This, combined with the natural patchy structure of the upland areas they inhabit, is leading to a decline in viable striped newt habitat. The drastic change of newt habitat ecology may lower the population viability and potentially cause an extinction vortex.

At the community-ecosystem scale, temporary ponds are essential for the breeding success of the newts. Human efforts to ditch, drain, or otherwise fill up the vernal pools reduce the chance of successful egg laying. Additionally, off-road vehicles have had an increasingly detrimental effect on the vegetation surrounding these temporary ponds. When the vegetation is destroyed, the newts do not have anything to lay their eggs on and reproduction is impeded. Intense droughts have also played a role in the diminishing of temporary ponds. Long term dry-spells may make pools disappear for years on end, which make breeding impossible during that time.

The main factor that affects striped newts at the population-species scale is highway mortality. During their terrestrial migration, newts may wander onto roadways and be struck by passing vehicles. At the genetic scale, there is evidence which suggests a lack of gene flow and loss of biodiversity between breeding populations, with severe habitat fragmentation being to blame. Their subpopulations are isolated, resulting in a potential loss of gene flow and immigration/emigration and an increase in local stochasticity.

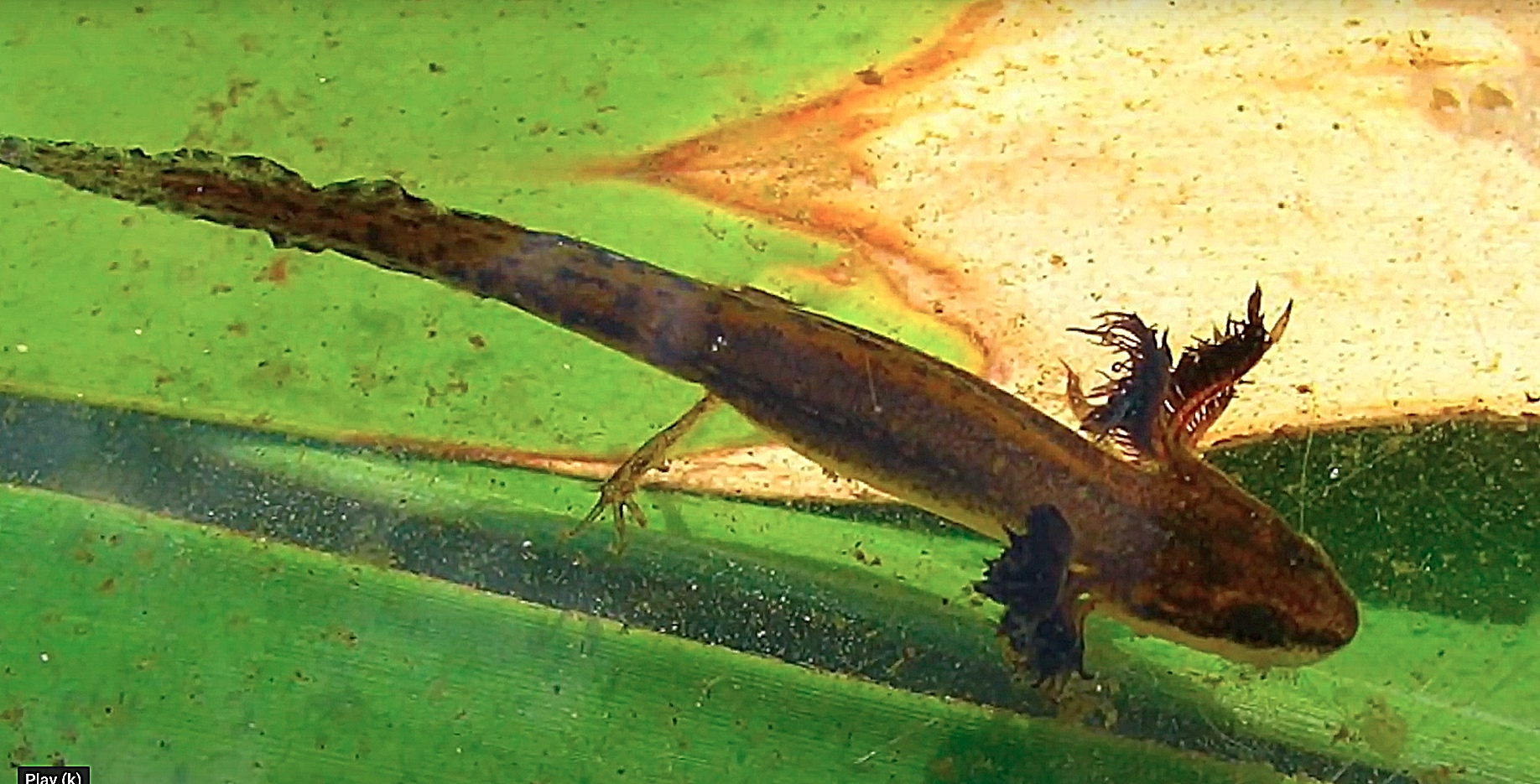
Striped Newt larvae, Florida
