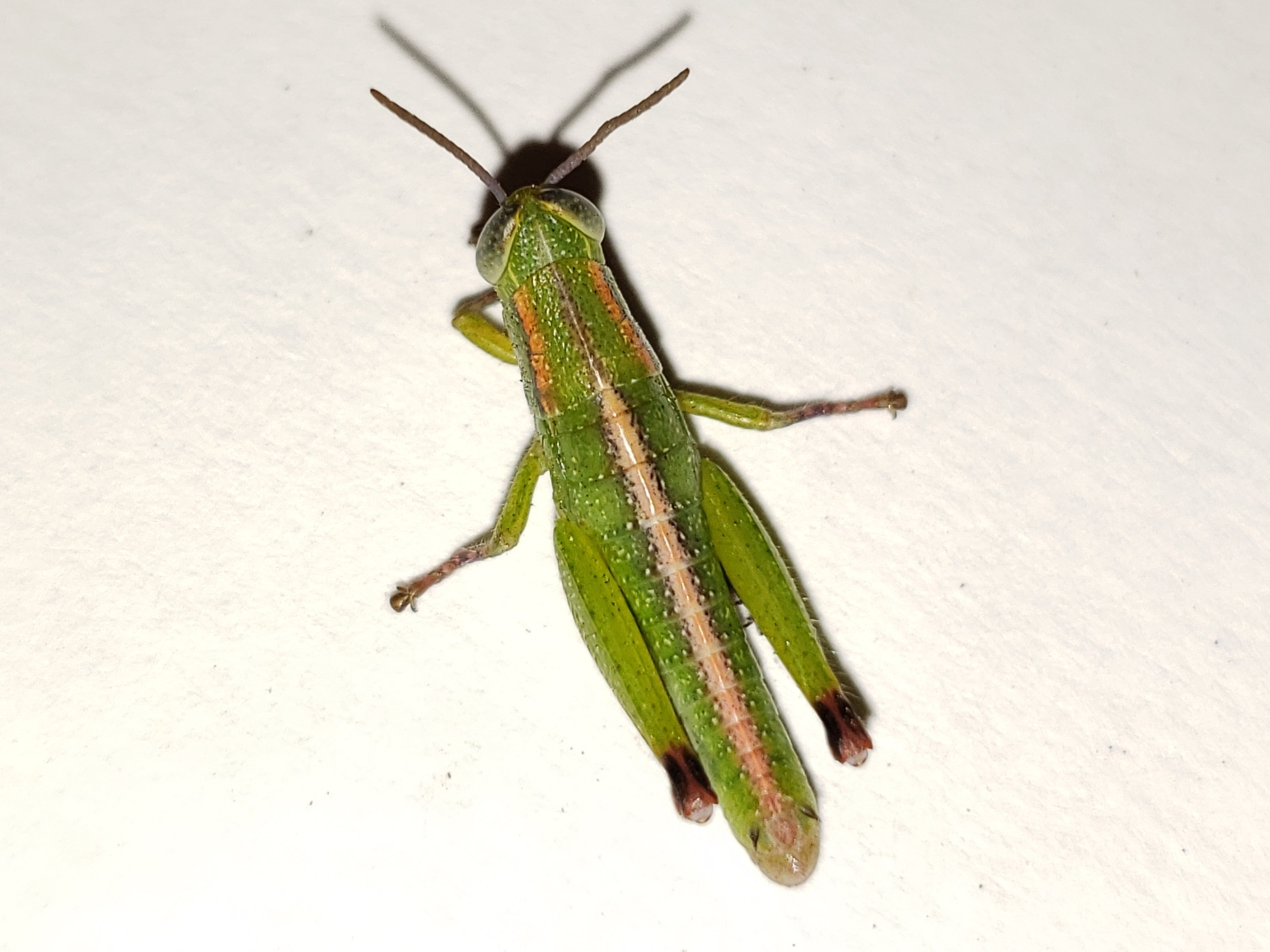
- Floritettix aptera, wingless Florida grasshopper, Florida

Scientific classification
- Domain: Eukaryota
- Kingdom: Animalia
- Phylum: Arthropoda
- Class: Insecta
- Order: Orthoptera
- Suborder: Caelifera
- Family: Acrididae
- Subfamily: Melanoplinae
- Tribe: Melanoplini
- Genus: Floritettix; Otte, 2014

= Floritettix =

Genus of grasshoppers

Floritettix is a genus of spur-throated grasshoppers in the family Acrididae. There are about 13 described species in Floritettix, found in North America.

== Species ==
These 13 species belong to the genus Floritettix:

- Floritettix aptera (Scudder, 1878) (wingless Florida grasshopper)
- Floritettix borealis (Hebard, 1936)
- Floritettix calusa Otte, 2014
- Floritettix coquinae (Hebard, 1936)
- Floritettix floridana Otte, 2014
- Floritettix hadjoi Otte, 2014
- Floritettix holatamico Otte, 2014
- Floritettix hubbelli (Hebard, 1936)
- Floritettix nigropicta (Hebard, 1936)
- Floritettix ocilla Otte, 2014
- Floritettix osceola Otte, 2014
- Floritettix saturiba (Hebard, 1936)
- Floritettix simplex (Hebard, 1936)
