= Floritettix nigropicta =

Scientific classification
- Kingdom: Animalia
- Phylum: Arthropoda
- Class: Insecta
- Order: Orthoptera
- Suborder: Caelifera
- Family: Acrididae
- Subfamily: Melanoplinae
- Tribe: Melanoplini
- Genus: Floritettix
- Species: F. nigropicta

Binomial name
- Floritettix nigropicta (Hebard, 1936)

Synonyms
- Aptenopedes nigropicta Hebard, 1936

Species of spur-throated grasshopper

Floritettix nigropicta, the dark-painted scrub grasshopper, is a species of spur-throated grasshopper in the family Acrididae. It is endemic to central Florida in the United States.
