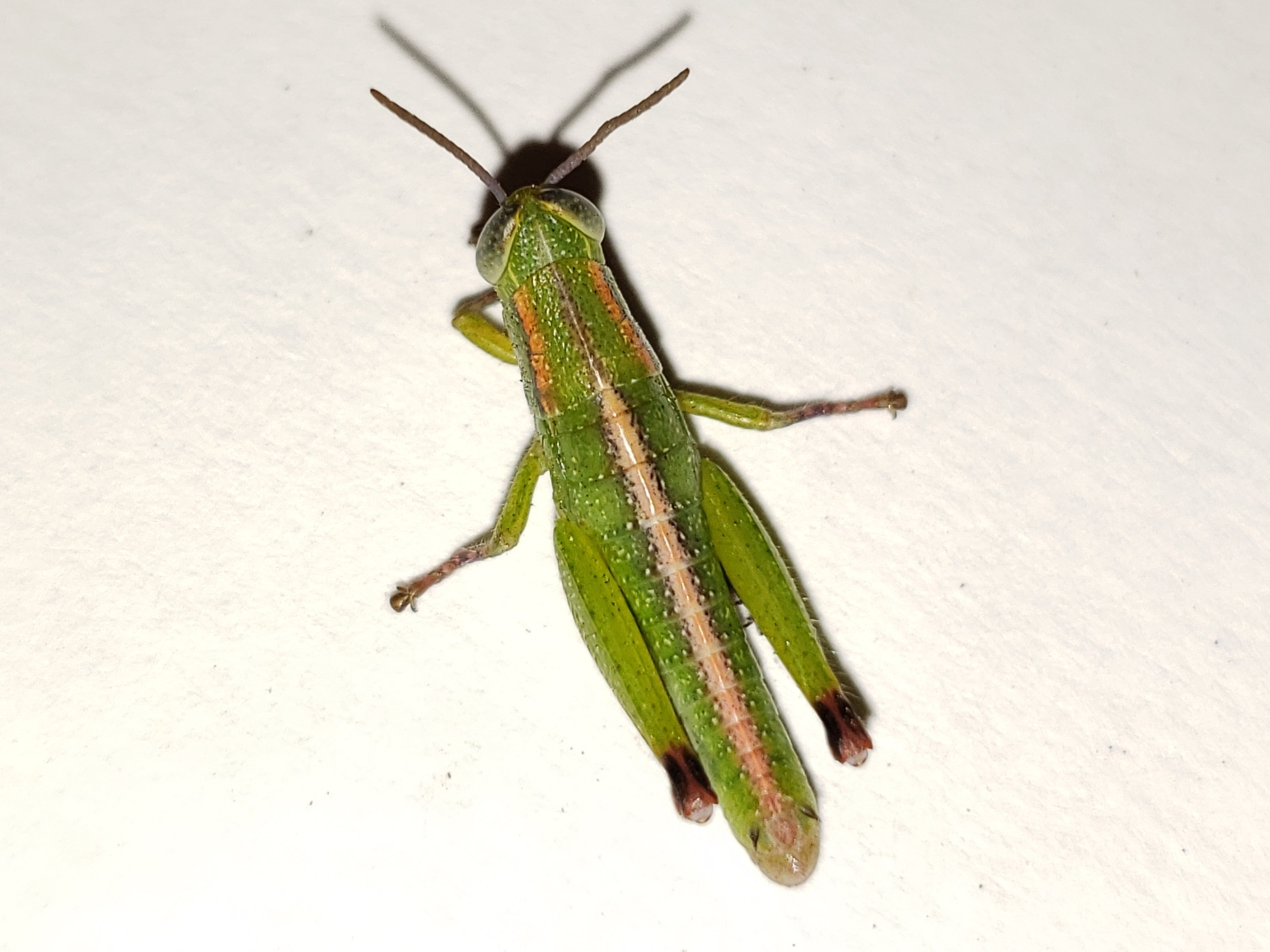
- Floritettix aptera, wingless Florida grasshopper, Florida

Scientific classification
- Domain: Eukaryota
- Kingdom: Animalia
- Phylum: Arthropoda
- Class: Insecta
- Order: Orthoptera
- Suborder: Caelifera
- Family: Acrididae
- Subfamily: Melanoplinae
- Tribe: Melanoplini
- Genus: Floritettix
- Species: F. aptera

Binomial name
- Floritettix aptera (Scudder, 1878)

= Floritettix aptera =

Species of spur-throated grasshopper

Floritettix aptera, the wingless Florida grasshopper, is a species of spur-throated grasshopper in the family Acrididae. It is found in Florida, as the name suggests.
