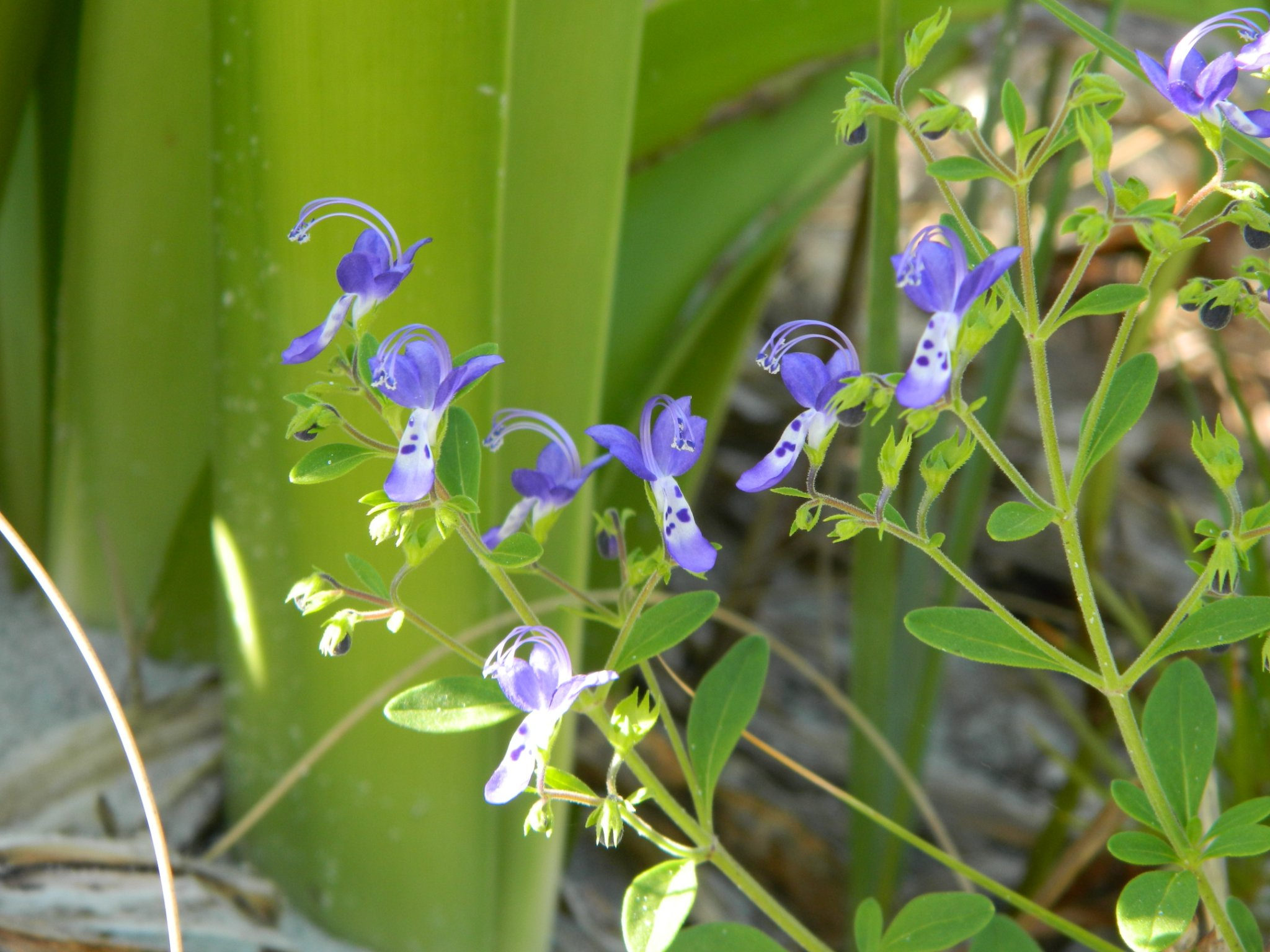

Scientific classification
- Kingdom: Plantae
- Clade: Tracheophytes
- Clade: Angiosperms
- Clade: Eudicots
- Clade: Asterids
- Order: Lamiales
- Family: Lamiaceae
- Genus: Trichostema
- Species: T. floridanum

Binomial name
- Trichostema floridanum K.S.McClell. & Weakley

= Trichostema floridanum =

Species of flowering plant

Trichostema floridanum, commonly known as Florida bluecurls, is a species of flowering plant in the mint family (Lamiaceae). It is native to the southeastern United States and the Bahamas, where it occurs primarily in coastal and subtropical habitats. The species was described in 2023 as part of a taxonomic revision that recognized previously unrecognized diversity within North American members of the genus Trichostema.

== Description ==
Trichostema floridanum is an aromatic suffrutescent perennial with opposite leaves and square stems characteristic of the mint family. The flowers are typical of the genus, with a two-lipped (bilabiate) corolla and extended, curled stamens. In the original description, diagnostic characters separating this species from closely related taxa include features of the overall plant architecture, leaf shape, and stem pubescence.

== Distribution and habitat ==
This species is native to Florida in the southeastern United States and has also been documented at one location in the Bahamas. It primarily occurs in coastal and subtropical environments, including maritime hammocks, dunes, grasslands, and coastal scrub habitats.

== Conservation ==
T. floridanum currently does not have a global rank, but is listed as S3S4, rounded to S3 (Vulnerable), by NatureServe. The Bahamian population may be extirpated; the last documentation of Trichostema in the Bahamas comes from the 1970s.

== Taxonomy ==
T. floridanum was first described by McClelland and Weakley in 2023 in the journal Phytotaxa following a revision of Coastal Plain taxa that incorporated morphological and genetic analyses. The specific epithet "floridanum" refers to its primary occurrence in Florida and nearby coastal regions.

== Gallery ==
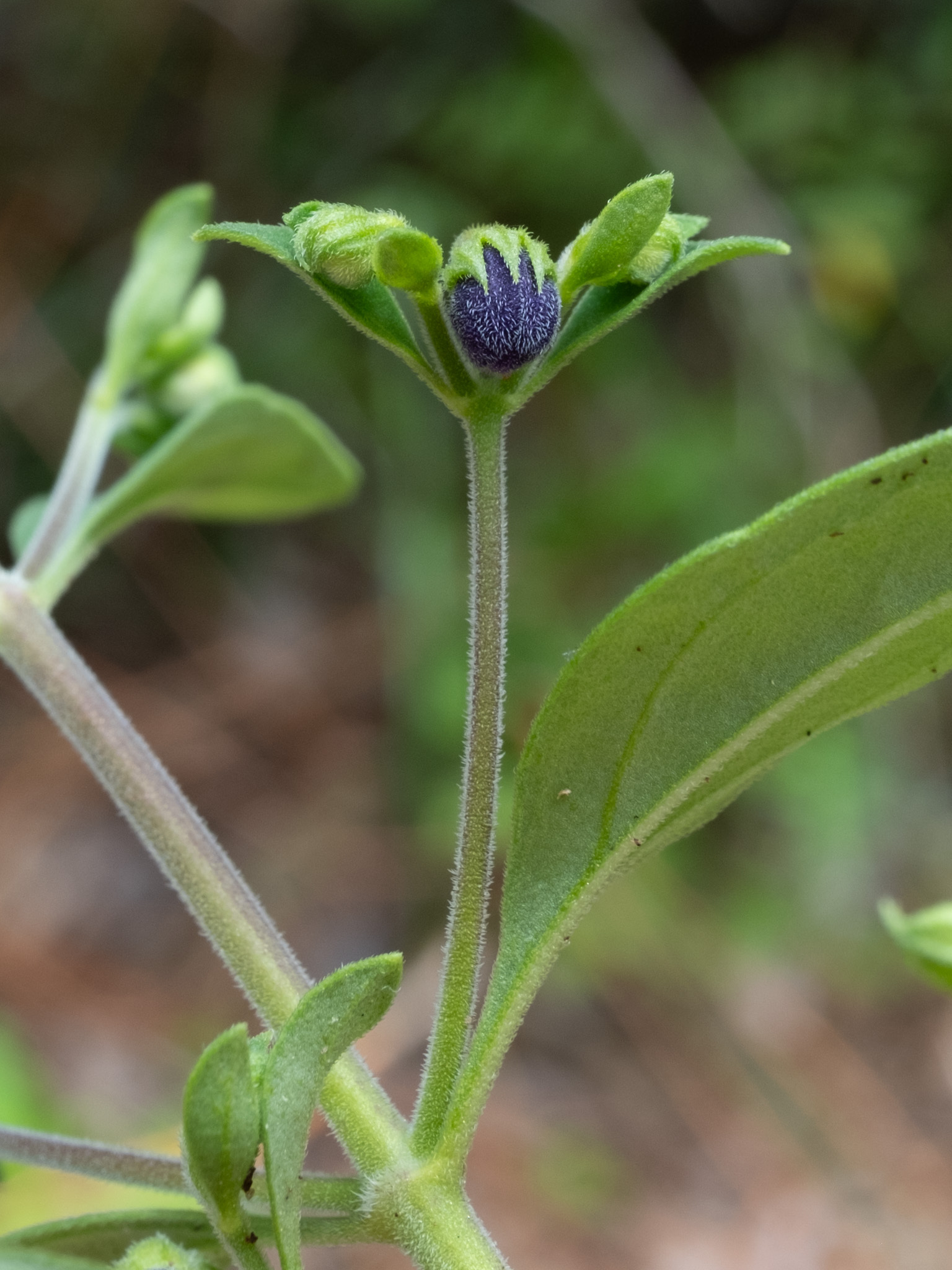
Budding inflorescence

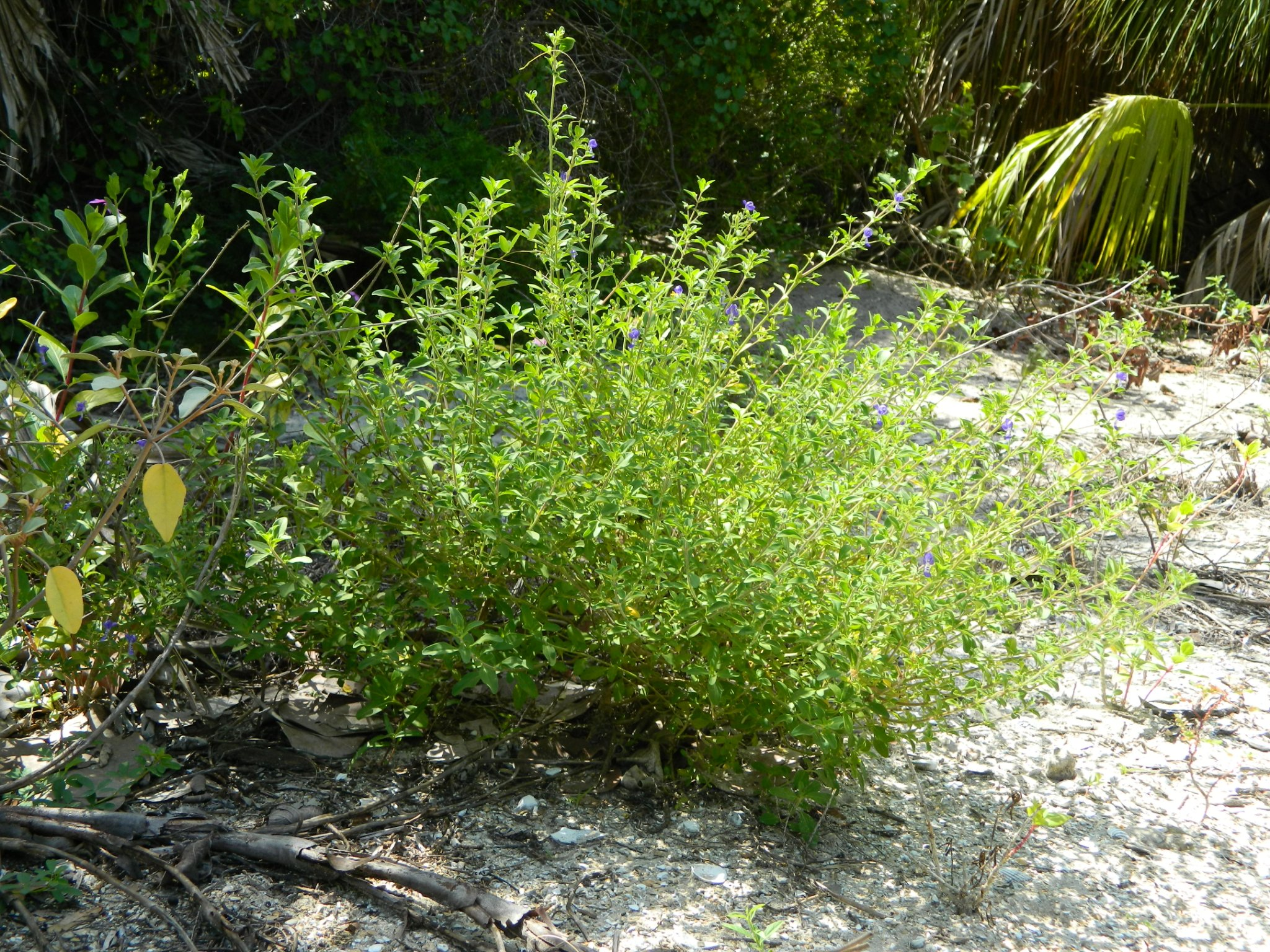
Whole plant

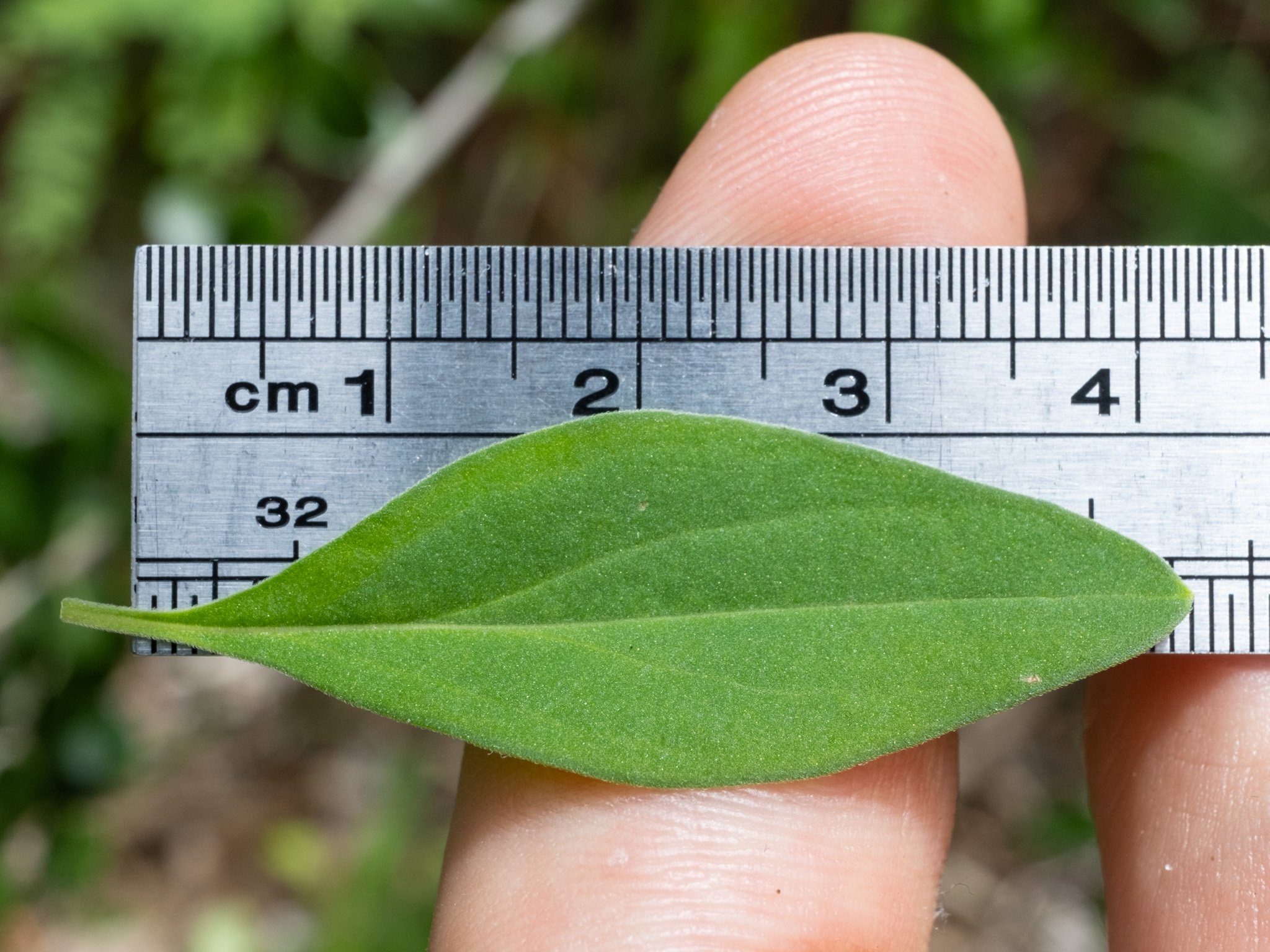
Leaf with scale

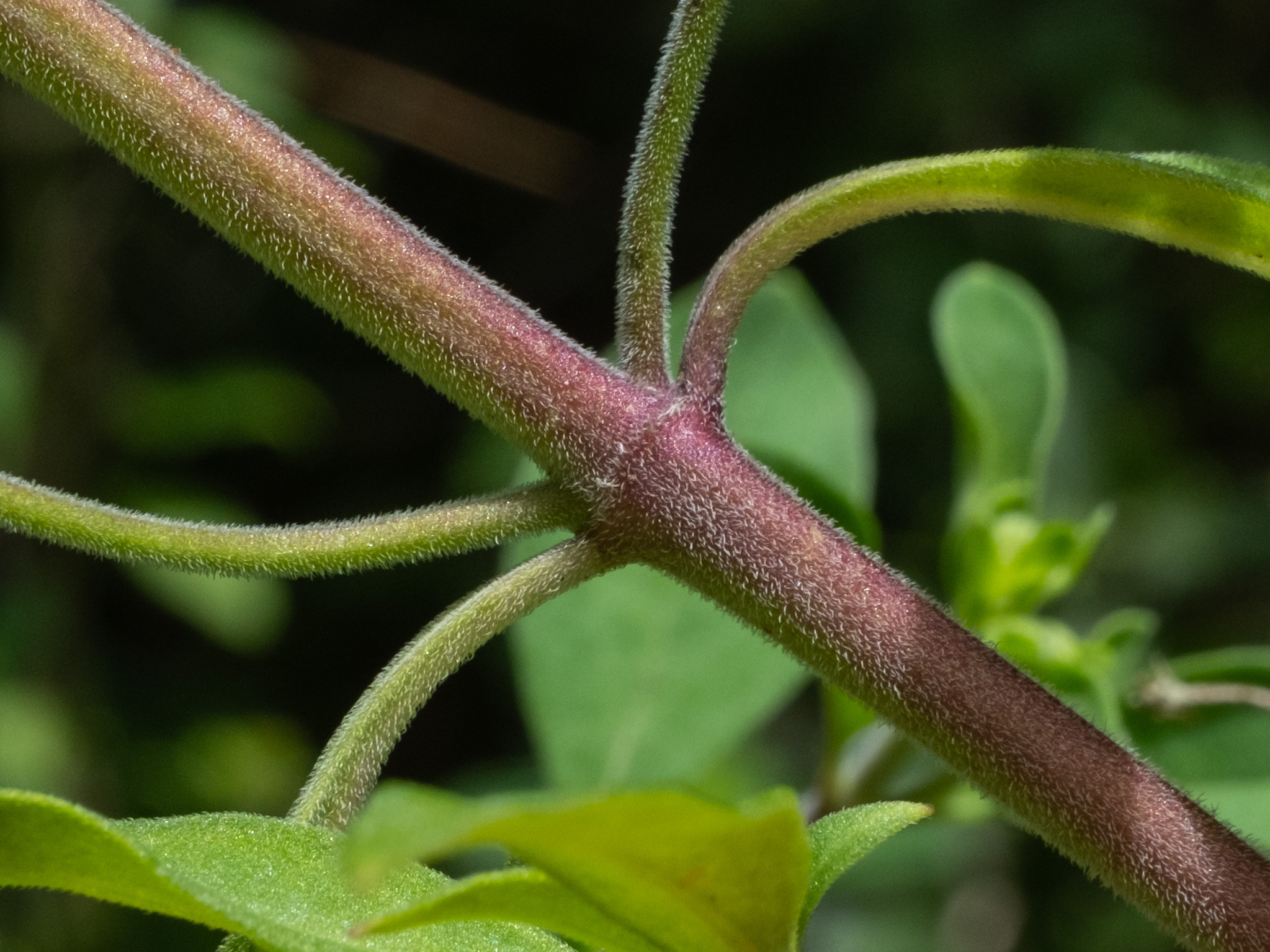
Stem pubescence
