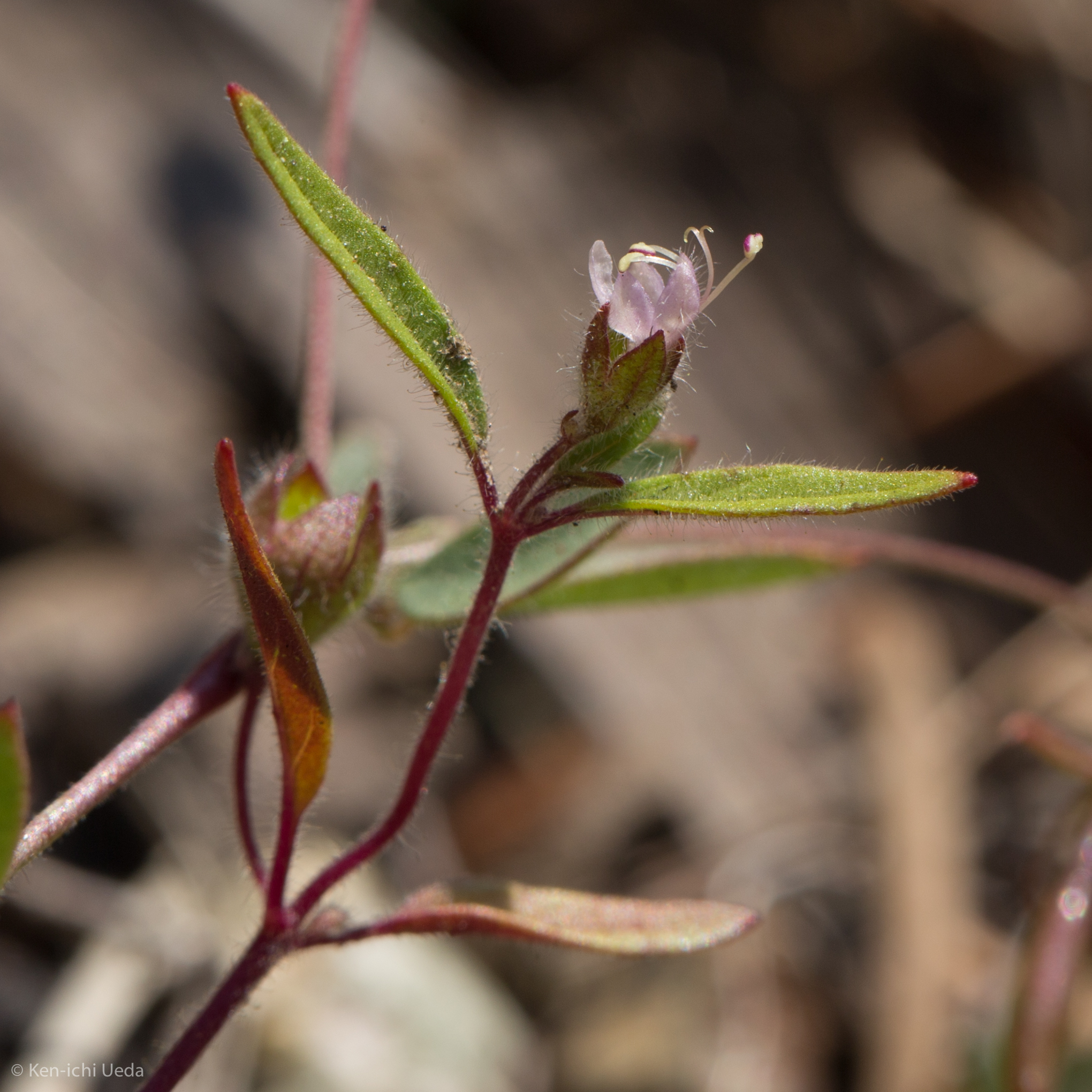

Conservation status
- Apparently Secure (NatureServe)

Scientific classification
- Kingdom: Plantae
- Clade: Tracheophytes
- Clade: Angiosperms
- Clade: Eudicots
- Clade: Asterids
- Order: Lamiales
- Family: Lamiaceae
- Genus: Trichostema
- Species: T. simulatum

Binomial name
- Trichostema simulatum Jeps.

= Trichostema simulatum =

Species of flowering plant

Trichostema simulatum is a species of flowering plant in the mint family known by the common name Siskiyou bluecurls.

It is found n the western United States, where it is native to the southern Cascade Range in northern California and southern Oregon, and in the northern Sierra Nevada of California.

It grows in open and generally sandy or gravelly sites of Yellow pine forests and adjacent habitats, at 500–1,600 metres (1,600–5,200 ft) in elevation.

== Description ==
Trichostema simulatum is an annual herb grows up to about 40 centimetres (16 in) tall.

Its aromatic foliage is coated in long and short glandular and nonglandular hairs. The lance-shaped leaves are 2 to 5 centimeters long.

The inflorescence is a long cyme of flowers growing from the stem between each leaf pair. Each flower has a hairy calyx of sepals with triangular points and a tubular, lipped purple corolla. The four protruding stamens are curved.
