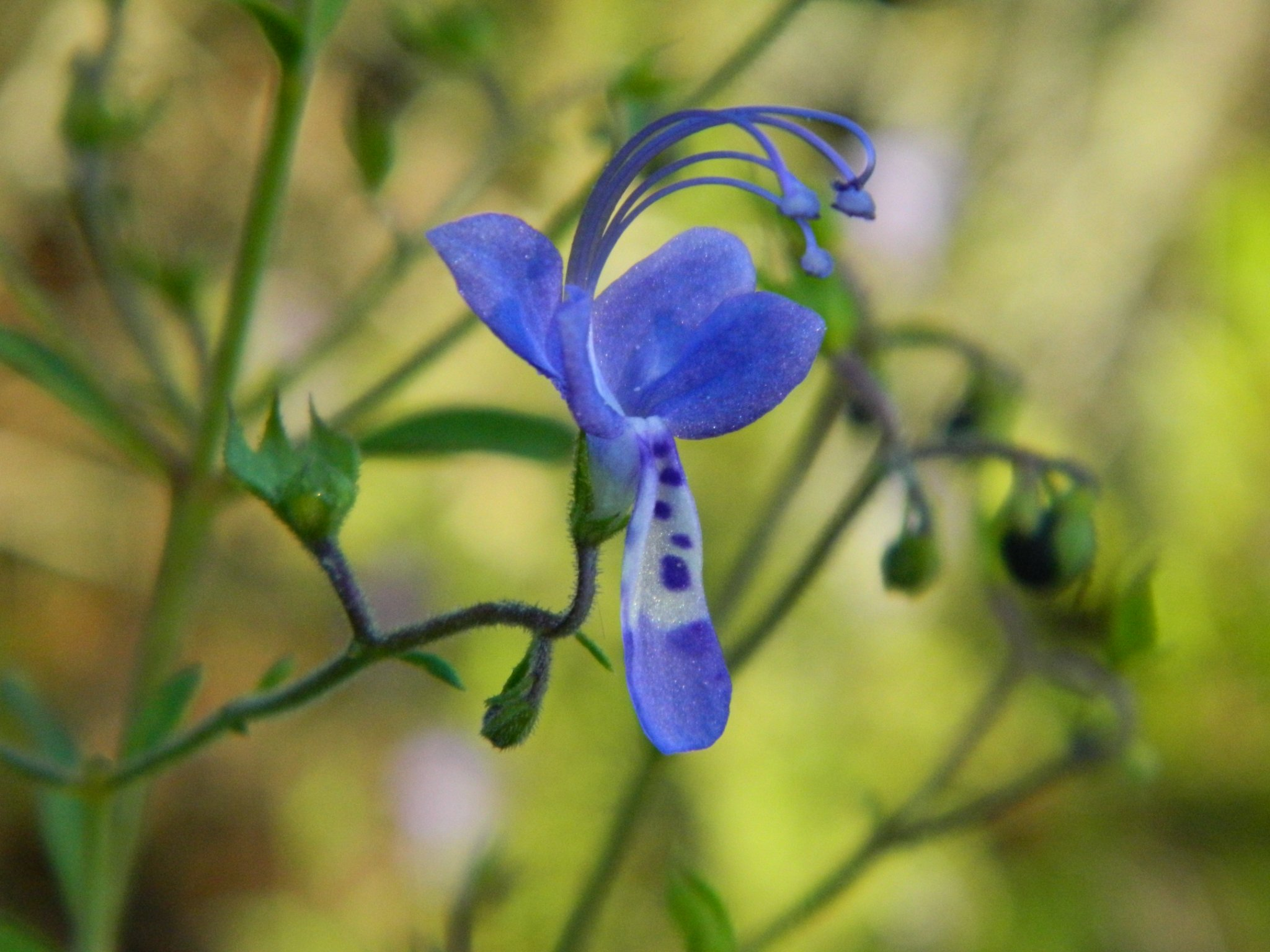

Conservation status
- Vulnerable (NatureServe)

Scientific classification
- Kingdom: Plantae
- Clade: Tracheophytes
- Clade: Angiosperms
- Clade: Eudicots
- Clade: Asterids
- Order: Lamiales
- Family: Lamiaceae
- Genus: Trichostema
- Species: T. gracile

Binomial name
- Trichostema gracile K.S.McClell.

= Trichostema gracile =

Species of flowering plant

Trichostema gracile, commonly known as Flatwoods Bluecurls, is a species of flowering plant in the mint family (Lamiaceae). It is endemic to Florida in the southeastern United States. The species was described in 2023 as part of a taxonomic revision recognizing previously unrecognized diversity within North American members of the genus Trichostema.

== Taxonomy ==
Trichostema gracile was formally described by K.S. McClelland in 2023 in the journal Phytotaxa. The species was distinguished from closely related taxa based on morphological, ecological, and genetic characters evaluated during a revision of the genus focused on the North American Coastal Plain. The name is currently accepted by major taxonomic authorities, including Plants of the World Online.

== Description ==
Trichostema gracile is an aromatic herbaceous plant with opposite leaves and square stems, typical of members of the mint family. Floral morphology conforms to the genus Trichostema, with bilaterally symmetrical flowers and exserted stamens. Diagnostic characters separating the species from related taxa include details of leaf size and shape, as well as features of the calyx and inflorescence, as outlined in the original description.

== Distribution and habitat ==
The species is endemic to Florida, where it occurs in mesic to scrubby flatwoods. Its known distribution is restricted, reflecting both habitat specialization and recent taxonomic recognition.

== Conservation ==
Trichostema gracile is currently tracked by the Florida Natural Areas Inventory (FNAI). It has a state rank of S3S4 (Vulnerable or Apparently Secure) given by FNAI and a global rank of G3G4, rounded to G3 (Vulnerable), by NatureServe.

== Gallery ==
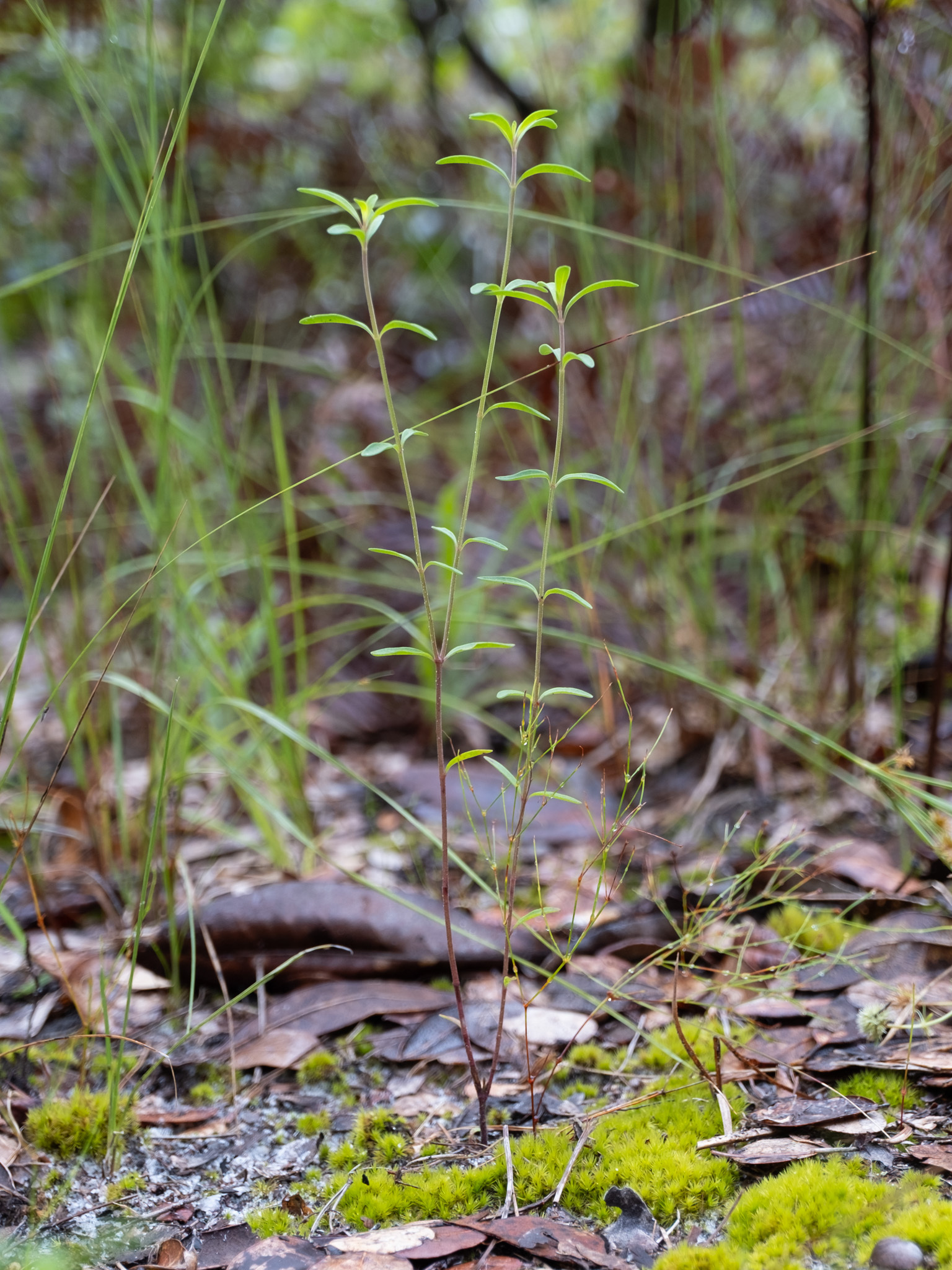
Wole plant

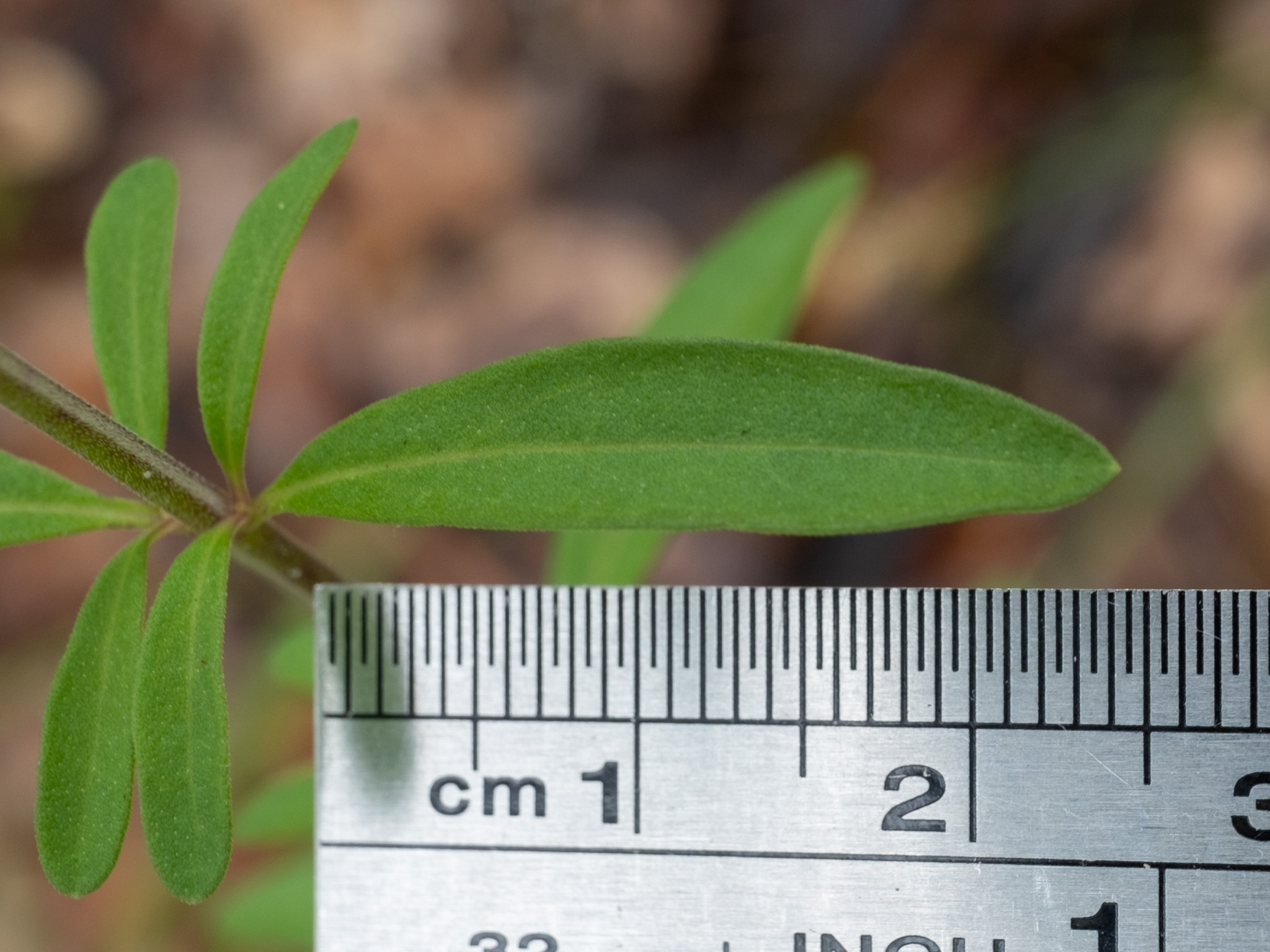
Leaf with scale

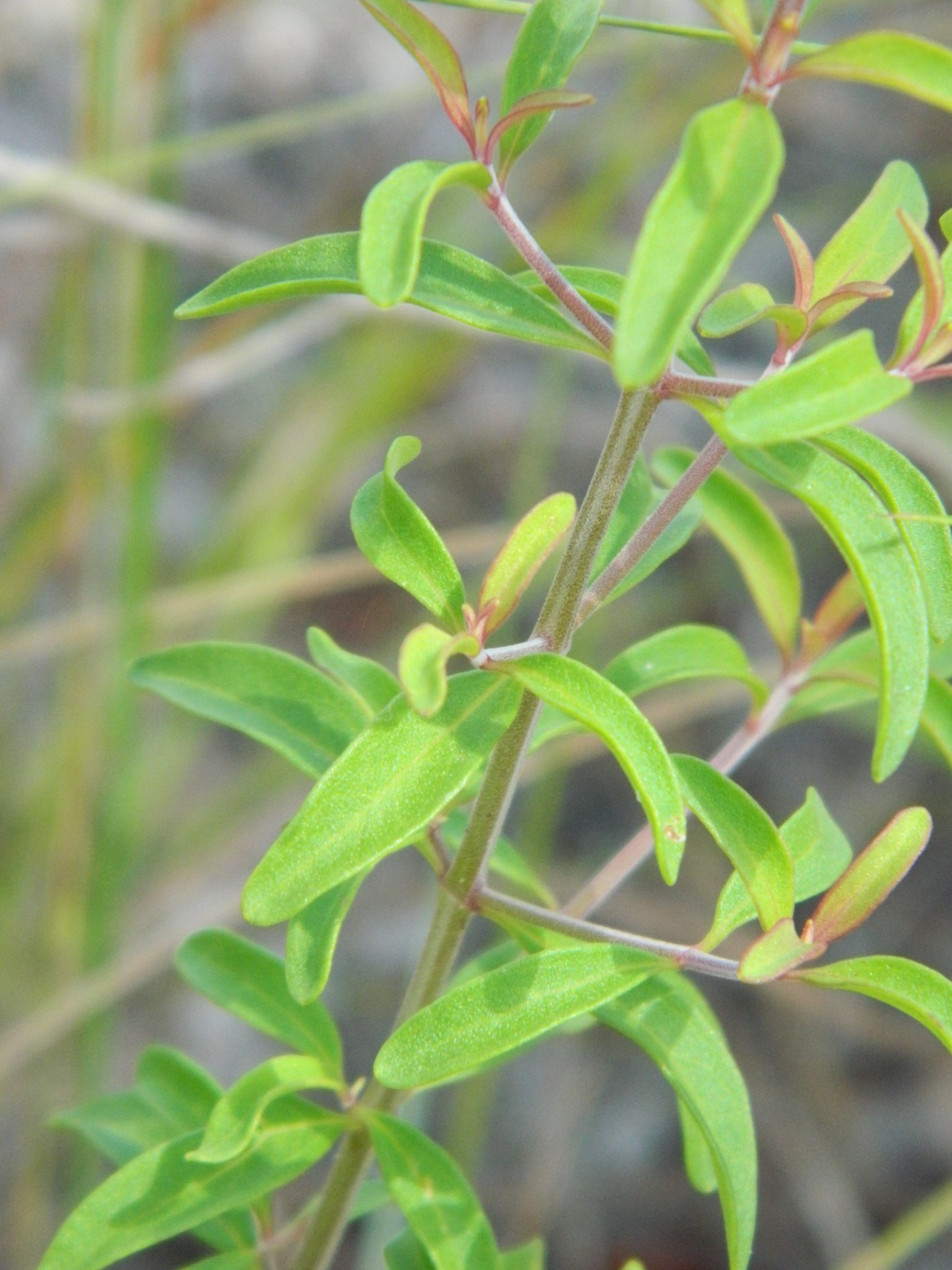
Leaves

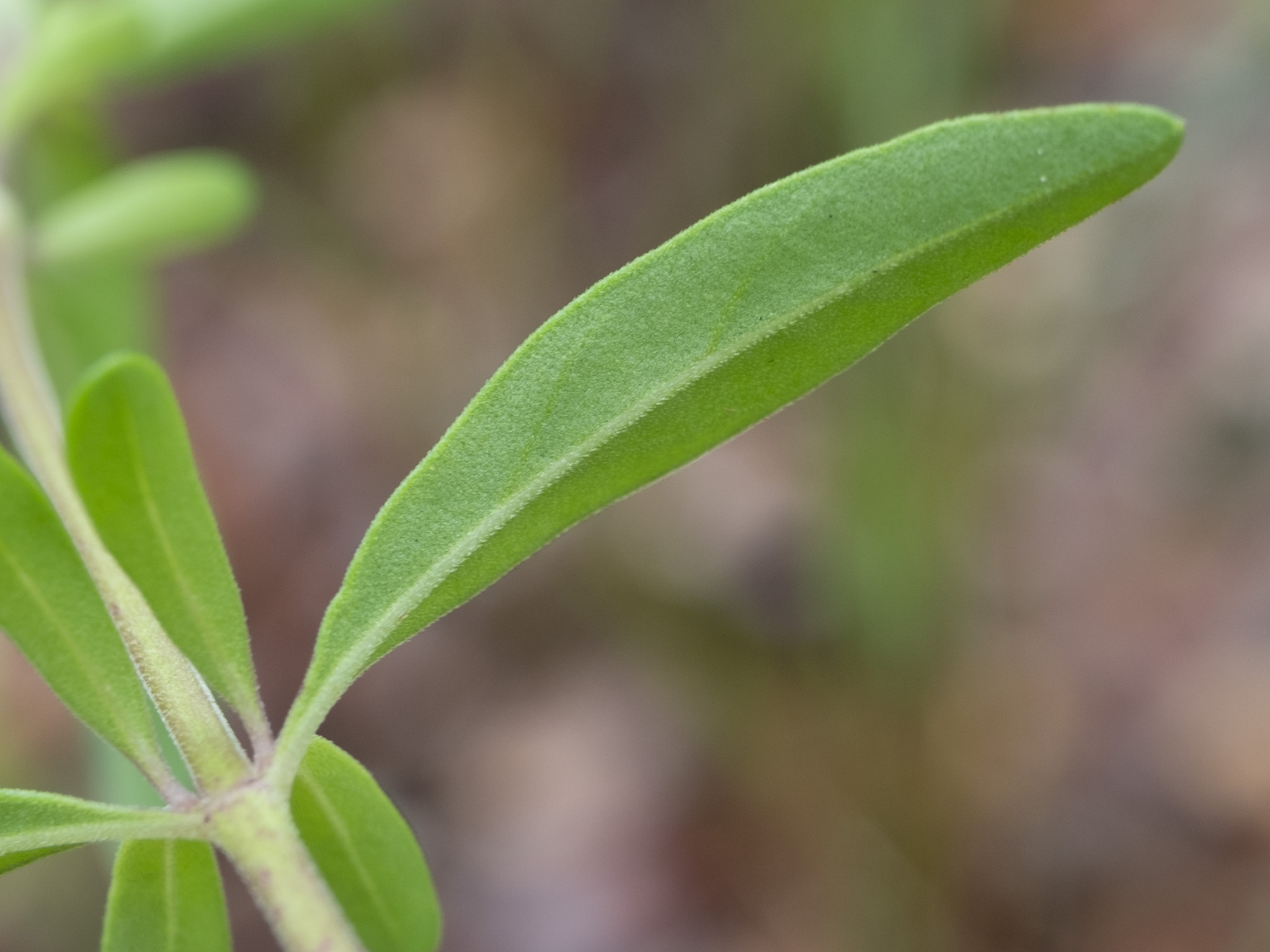
Abaxial leaf surface
