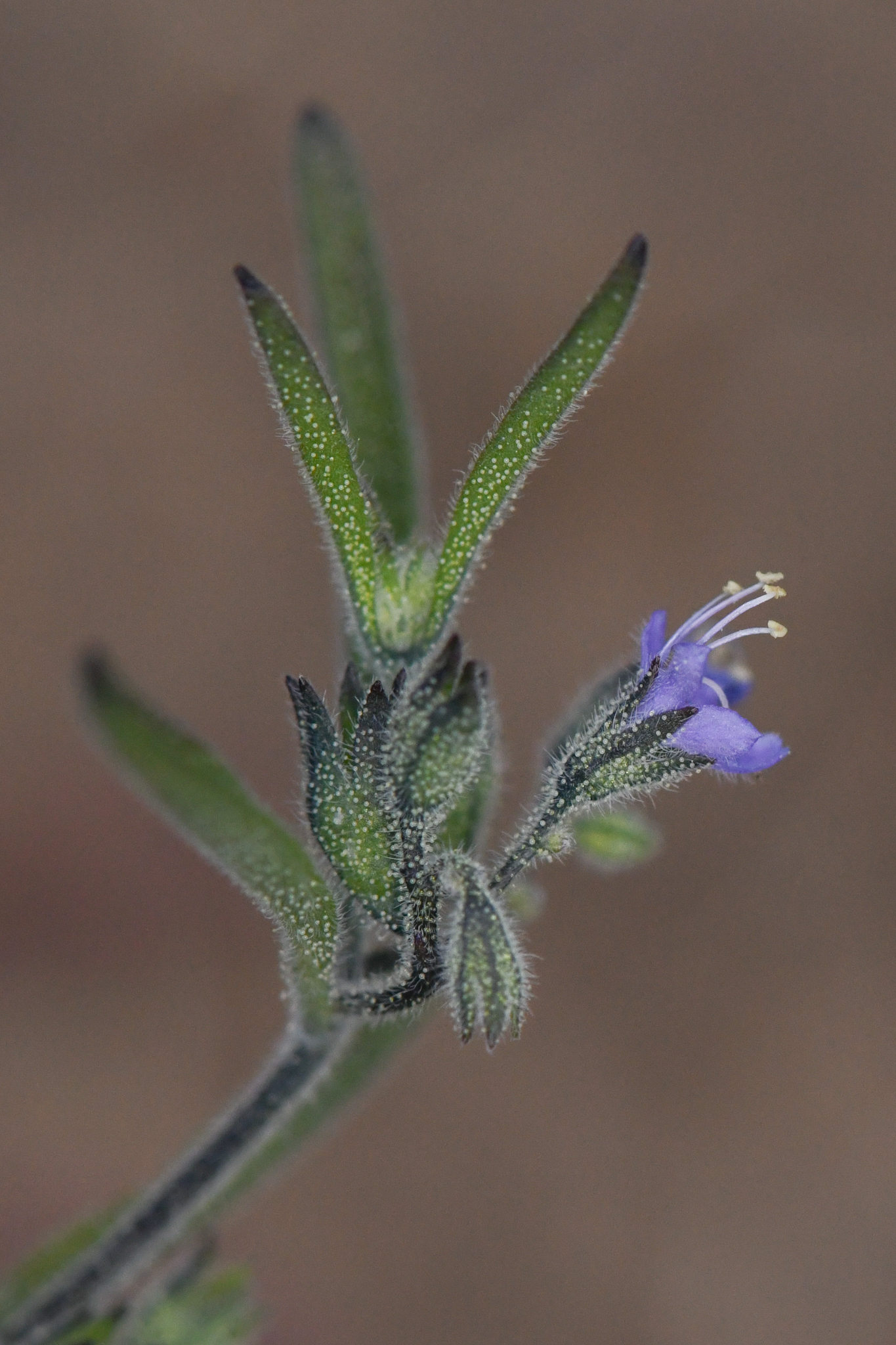

Conservation status
- Apparently Secure (NatureServe)

Scientific classification
- Kingdom: Plantae
- Clade: Tracheophytes
- Clade: Angiosperms
- Clade: Eudicots
- Clade: Asterids
- Order: Lamiales
- Family: Lamiaceae
- Genus: Trichostema
- Species: T. micranthum

Binomial name
- Trichostema micranthum A.Gray

= Trichostema micranthum =

Species of flowering plant

Trichostema micranthum is a species of flowering plant in the mint family, known by the common name smallflower bluecurls.

== Distribution ==
The plant is native to Southern California, northwestern Arizona, and northern Baja California state. In California populations are found in the San Bernardino Mountains and San Emigdio Mountains of the Transverse Ranges.

Its habitat includes meadow wetlands and riparian riverbanks, often in white fir (Abies concolor) and Yellow pine forest habitats. It grows at 1,500–2,500 metres (4,900–8,200 ft) in elevation.

== Description ==
Trichostema micranthum is an annual herb growing to under 3 decimetres (12 in) in maximum height.

Its aromatic foliage is coated in short, glandular and nonglandular hairs. The pointed oval or lance-shaped leaves are up to 4.5 centimeters long.

The inflorescence is a series of clusters of flowers located at each leaf pair. Each flower has a hairy calyx of pointed sepals and a tubular, lipped purple corolla a few millimeters in length. The four stamens are sometimes protrude from the lips of the corolla.
