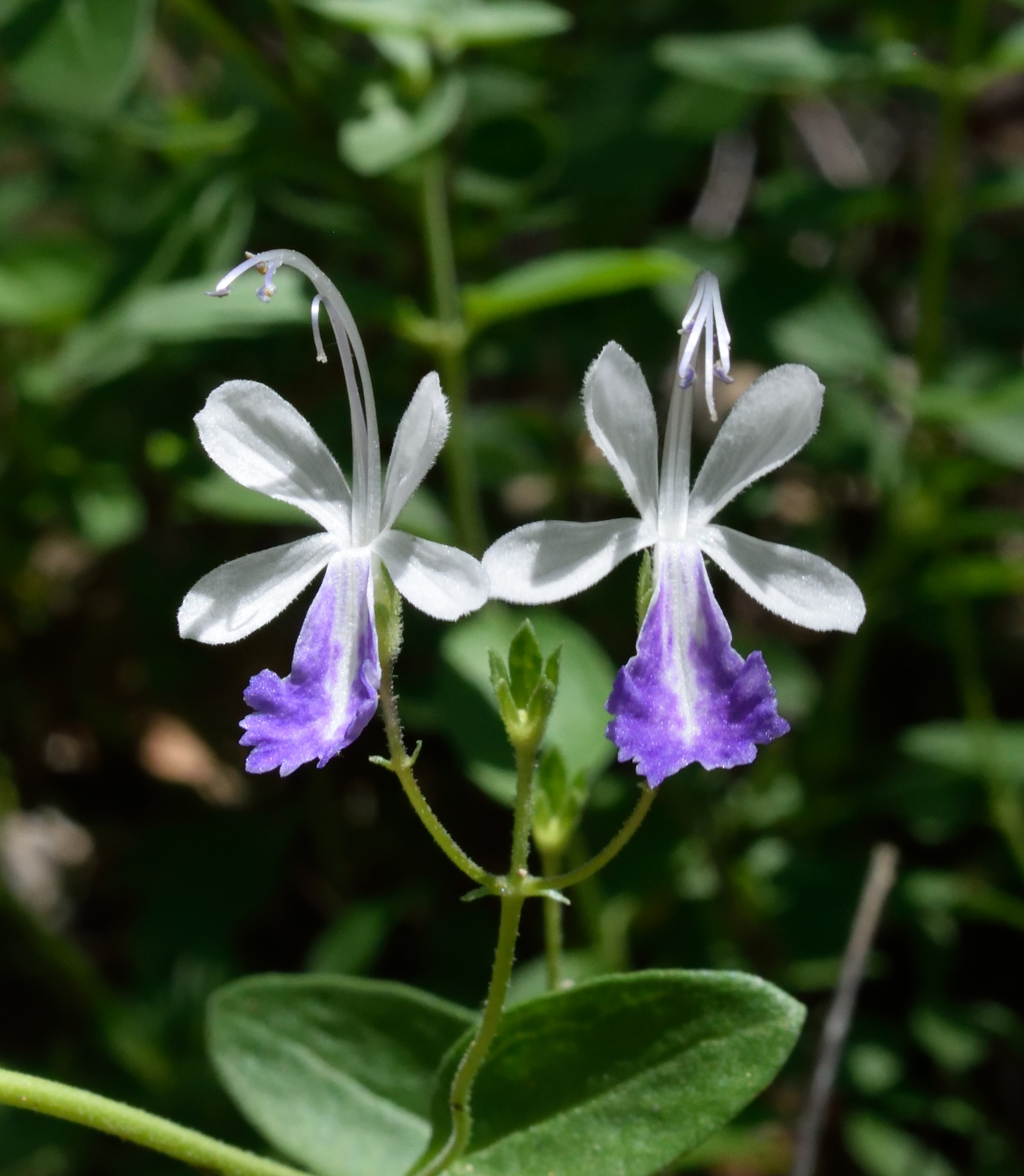

Conservation status
- Apparently Secure (NatureServe)

Scientific classification
- Kingdom: Plantae
- Clade: Tracheophytes
- Clade: Angiosperms
- Clade: Eudicots
- Clade: Asterids
- Order: Lamiales
- Family: Lamiaceae
- Genus: Trichostema
- Species: T. arizonicum

Binomial name
- Trichostema arizonicum A.Gray

= Trichostema arizonicum =

Arizona bluecurls

Species of flowering plant

Trichostema arizonicum, the Arizona bluecurls, is a perennial plant in the mint family (Lamiaceae) native to the Southwestern United States (Arizona, New Mexico, Texas) and northwestern Mexico. It has striking curling flowers and can often be found along road sides. The genus name means "hair stems" in reference to the graceful stamens that curl around to dab pollen on the backs of insect pollinators.
