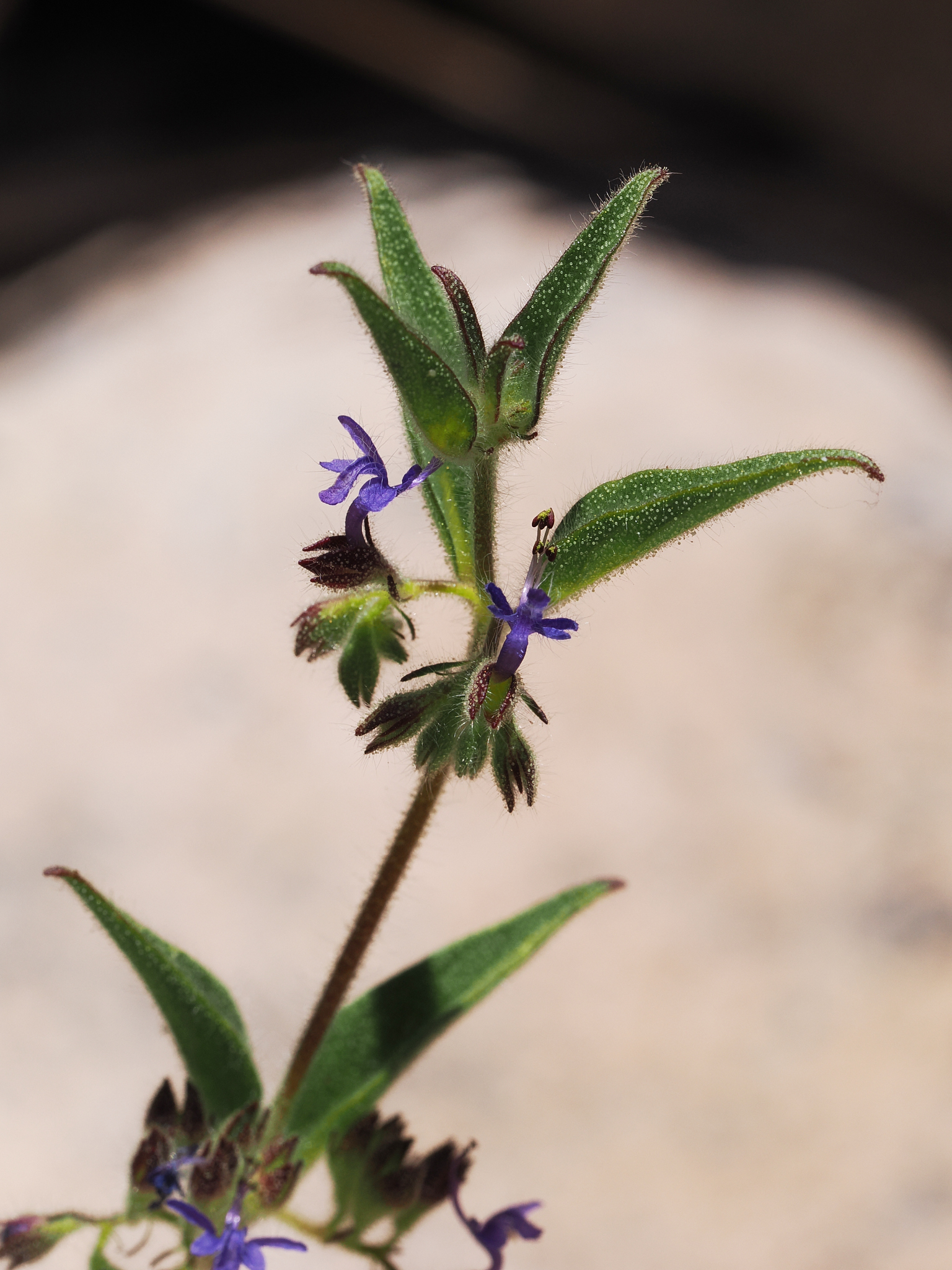

Conservation status
- Apparently Secure (NatureServe)

Scientific classification
- Kingdom: Plantae
- Clade: Tracheophytes
- Clade: Angiosperms
- Clade: Eudicots
- Clade: Asterids
- Order: Lamiales
- Family: Lamiaceae
- Genus: Trichostema
- Species: T. rubisepalum

Binomial name
- Trichostema rubisepalum Elmer

= Trichostema rubisepalum =

Species of flowering plant

Trichostema rubisepalum is a species of flowering plant in the mint family known by the common name Hernandez's bluecurls.

== Distribution ==
The plant is endemic to California. It has a disjunct distribution occurring in two main locations: the southern Diablo Range in southern San Benito County, and the western Sierra Nevada foothills, primarily within Mariposa County and Tuolumne County.

The species is a strict serpentine endemic of the Red Hills Serpentine Mass in Tuolumne County and the New Idria Serpentine Mass, Laguna Mountain Serpentine Mass, and Hepsedam Peak Serpentine Mass in southern San Benito County. Its habitat consists of seasonally moist areas including seasonal seeps and stream and river bed edges on serpentine substrates.

== Description ==
Trichostema rubisepalum is annual herb that grows to approximately 0.5 metres (1.6 ft) in maximum height. Its aromatic foliage is coated in long and short glandular and nonglandular hairs. The leaves are lance-shaped.

The inflorescence is a long cyme of flowers growing from the stem between each leaf pair. Each flower has a hairy calyx of pointed sepals which often take on a dark red coloration. The flower has a tubular throat and a lipped, purple corolla. The four protruding, curved stamens are about half a centimeter long.

Its bloom period is from June to July.
