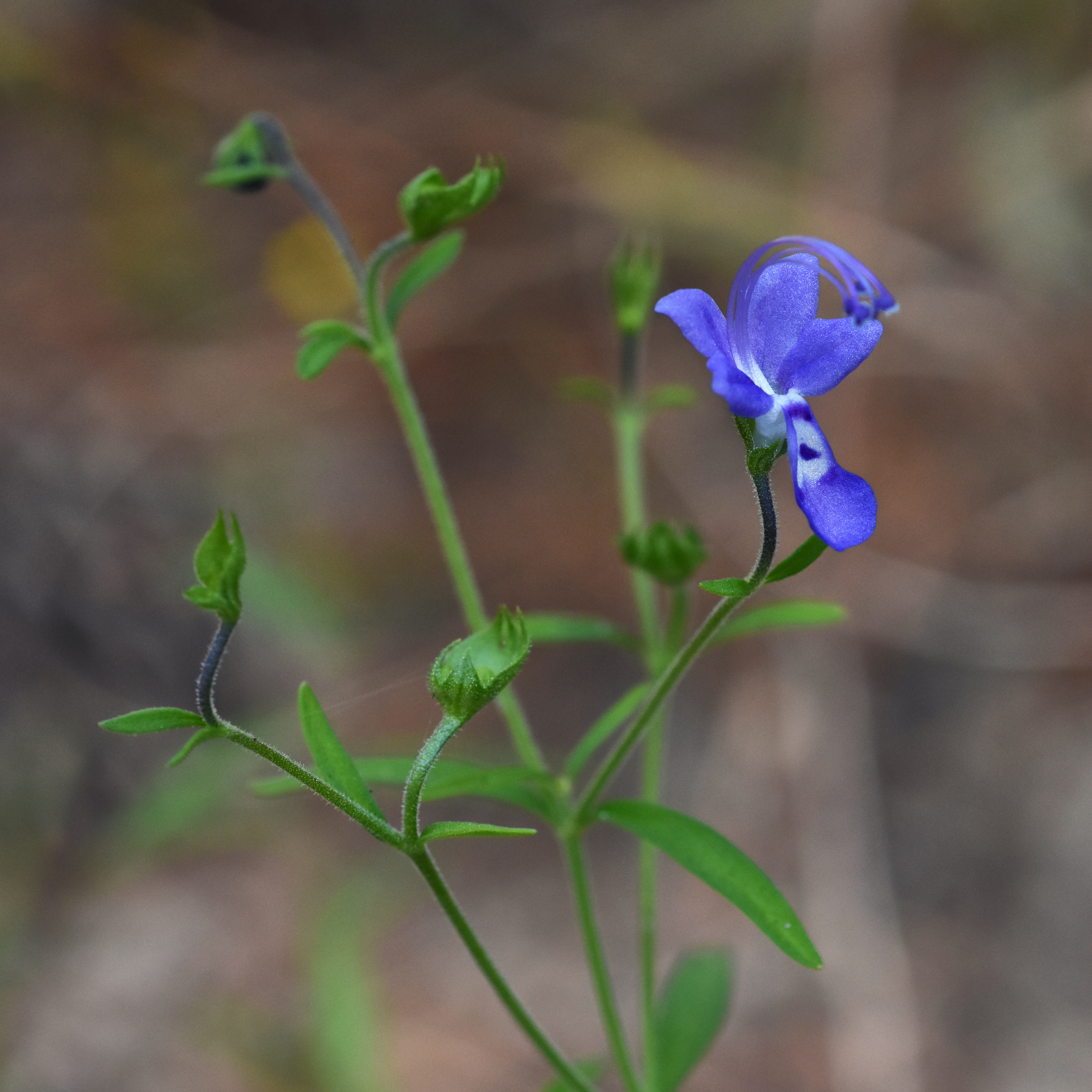

Conservation status
- Secure (NatureServe)

Scientific classification
- Kingdom: Plantae
- Clade: Tracheophytes
- Clade: Angiosperms
- Clade: Eudicots
- Clade: Asterids
- Order: Lamiales
- Family: Lamiaceae
- Genus: Trichostema
- Species: T. setaceum

Binomial name
- Trichostema setaceum Houtt.

Synonyms
- Trichostema lineare (Walter); Trichostema dichotomum L. var. lineare (Walter) Pursh

= Trichostema setaceum =

Species of plant

Trichostema setaceum is an herbaceous flowering plant. Commonly referred to as narrowleaf bluecurls, it is in the Lamiaceae (mint family). It grows in sandy soil, sandhills, and rocky uplands.

== Description ==
Narrowleaf bluecurls is an annual growing to 50 cm (20 in). Stunning purple-blue flowers are borne from September to October. The stamens extend far beyond the petals, growing up to 20 mm (0.79 in). The leaves of T. setaceum are entire.

== Conservation ==
It is listed as endangered in Kentucky, New York, Ohio, and Pennsylvania. It is critically imperiled in Missouri.
