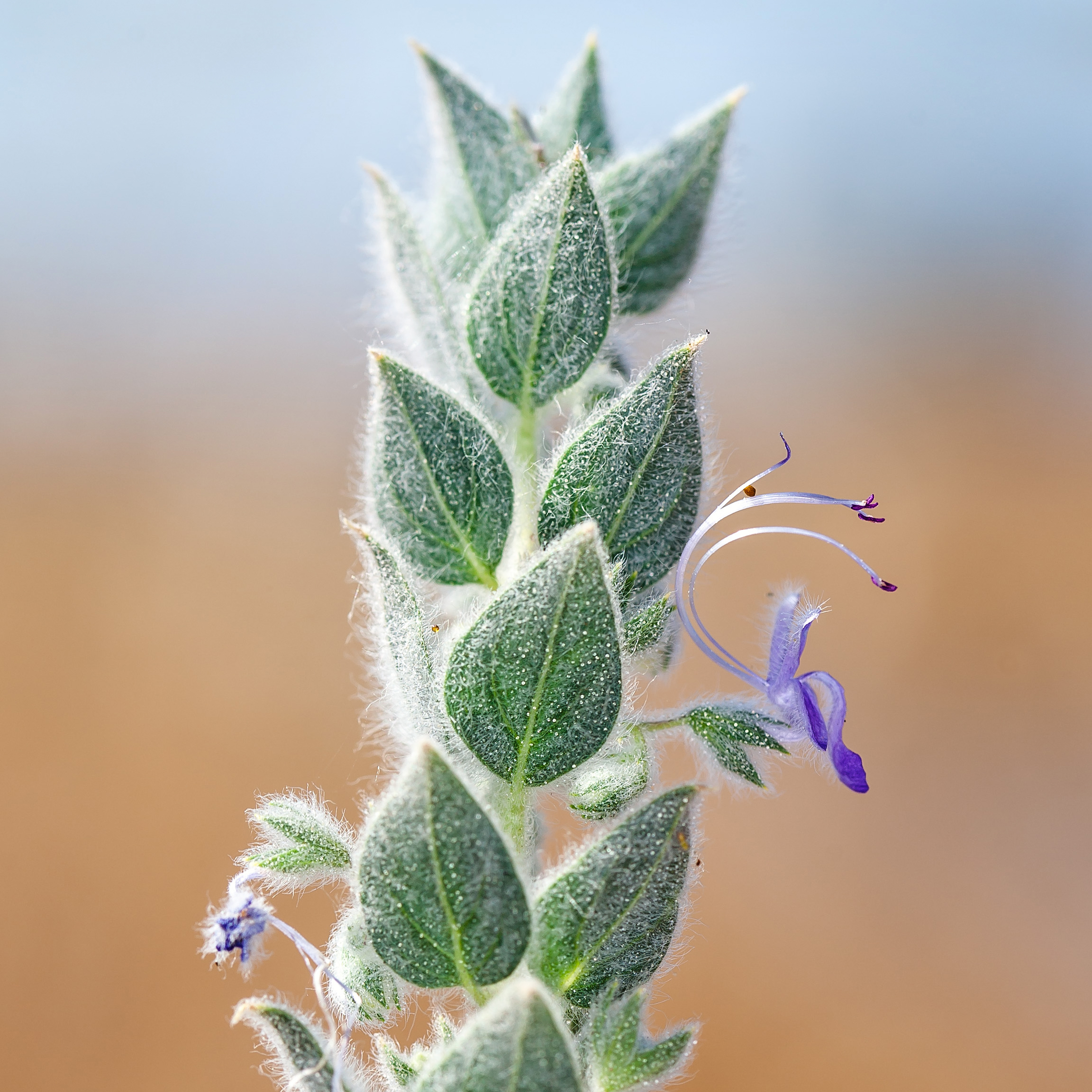

Conservation status
- Vulnerable (NatureServe)

Scientific classification
- Kingdom: Plantae
- Clade: Tracheophytes
- Clade: Angiosperms
- Clade: Eudicots
- Clade: Asterids
- Order: Lamiales
- Family: Lamiaceae
- Genus: Trichostema
- Species: T. ovatum

Binomial name
- Trichostema ovatum Curran

= Trichostema ovatum =

Species of flowering plant

Trichostema ovatum is an uncommon species of flowering plant in the mint family known by the common name San Joaquin bluecurls.

== Distribution ==
It is endemic to the San Joaquin Valley of California, where it occurs in grassland habitat, as well as disturbed and alkali soils, such as chenopod scrub.

== Description ==
Trichostema ovatum is an annual herb approaching 80 centimeters in maximum height, its aromatic herbage coated in woolly glandular and nonglandular hairs. The pointed oval leaves are 1 or 2 centimeters long. The inflorescence is a series of clusters of flowers located at each leaf pair. Each flower has a hairy calyx of pointed sepals and a tubular, lipped purple corolla. The four stamens are long and curved, measuring up to 1.6 centimeters long.

The plant blooms in May through October, with peak flowering in the hot summer. Adequate rainfall is necessary for germination.
