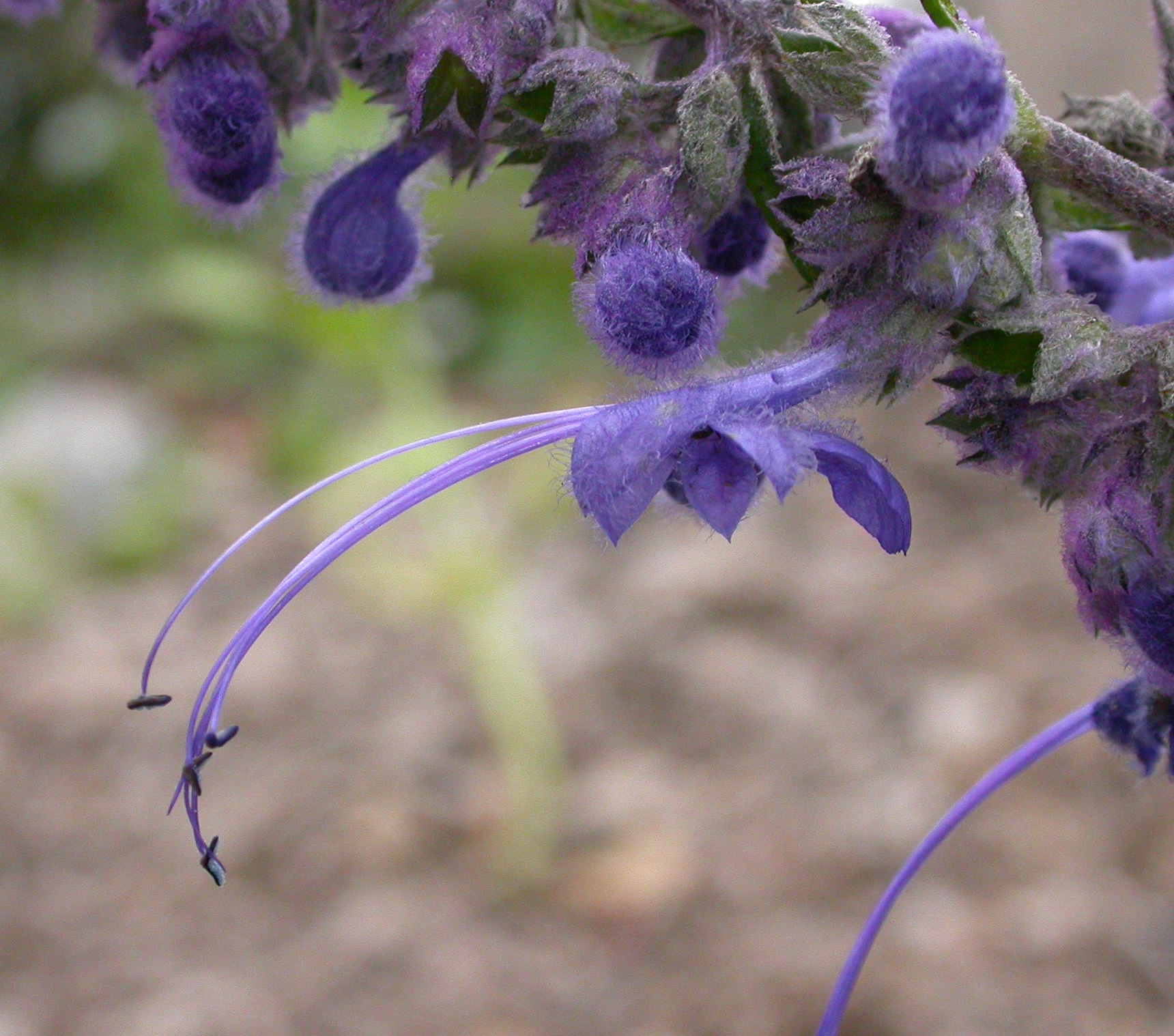
- Trichostema lanatum

Scientific classification
- Kingdom: Plantae
- Clade: Tracheophytes
- Clade: Angiosperms
- Clade: Eudicots
- Clade: Asterids
- Order: Lamiales
- Family: Lamiaceae
- Subfamily: Ajugoideae
- Genus: Trichostema; Gronov.

Type species
- Trichostema dichotomum L.

Synonyms
- Isanthus Michx.; Eplingia L.O.Williams

= Trichostema =

Genus of flowering plants

Trichostema is a genus of flowering plants in the family Lamiaceae, which are aromatic herbs, subshrubs, or shrubs. These plants are native to North America. Most species in this genus are referred to by the common name bluecurls because of their blue to purple flowers and relatively long, curled stamens.

== Description ==
Plants in the genus Trichostema are either annual herbs, perennial subshrubs, or perennial shrubs. Stems are four-angled, becoming rounder with age in the perennial species. The stems of all species bear glandular and eglandular hairs; these are important for identifying species. Leaves are opposite and simple, though some plants will rarely have leaves with one or two lobes. Flowers are arranged in cymes in the axils of leaves or bracts. Flowers consist of five fused sepals, five petals that are fused at the base, four stamens, and one four-lobed pistil. The individual sepals are either essentially the same length, as in sections Chromocephalum, Isanthus, Orthopodium, Paniculatum, and Rhodanthum, or there are three long and two short sepals, as in section Trichostema. The five petals are typically in the blue to violet color range with the bottom-most petal being white with blue-violet splotches, though Trichostema nesophilum,Trichostema purpusii, and individual plants with floral color mutations are exceptions. Stamens are typically arched to some degree and the same color as the petals, giving rise to their common name. The fruit of the plant is a schizocarp composed of four hard single-seeded mericarps (derived from the four lobes of the pistil), which are called nutlets.

== Taxonomy ==
Trichostema was formally described in 1753 by Linnaeus in Species Plantarum. This genus was also included in Linnaeus' Corollarium Genera Plantarum of 1737, in which Linnaeus credits Johann Gronovius as the author of the species.

== Species ==
There are 26 species recognized in the genus. These species are divided into 6 sections based on life history, morphology, chromosome number, and genetics. Research on Trichostema in Florida in the early 2020s concluded that there were 10 species native to the state (previously there were only three recognized). This determination was based on genetic, morphological, ecological, and phenological data.

The recognized species are:

- In section Chromocephalum F.H. Lewis:
  - Trichostema lanatum Benth. – California, Baja California
  - Trichostema parishii Vasey – California, Baja California
- In section Isanthus (Michx.) K.S. McClell.:
  - Trichostema coeruleum K.S. McClell. & Weakley - central, eastern, and southwestern North America
- In section Orthopodium Benth.:
  - Trichostema austromontanum F.H. Lewis ex K.S. McClell. & Weakley – California, Baja California
  - Trichostema lanceolatum Benth. – Oregon, California, Baja California
  - Trichostema laxum A. Gray – California
  - Trichostema micranthum A. Gray – Arizona, California, Baja California
  - Trichostema oblongum Benth. – British Columbia, Washington, Oregon, California, Nevada, Idaho
  - Trichostema ovatum Curran – California
  - Trichostema rubisepalum Elmer – central California
  - Trichostema ruygtii F.H. Lewis – northern California (Lake, Napa, Solano Counties)
  - Trichostema simulatum Jeps. – Oregon, California
- In section Paniculatum F.H. Lewis:
  - Trichostema arizonicum A. Gray – Arizona, New Mexico, northwestern Mexico
  - Trichostema mexicanum Epling – northeastern Mexico
- In section Rhodanthum F.H. Lewis:
  - Trichostema purpusii Brandegee – Oaxaca, Puebla
- In section Trichostema:
  - Trichostema bridgesii-orzellii K.S. McClell. - Florida
  - Trichostema dichotomum L. – Quebec, Ontario, eastern and south-central United States
  - Trichostema floridanum K.S. McClell. & Weakley - Florida, Bahamas
  - Trichostema fruticosum K.S. McClell. - Mississippi, Alabama, Florida, Georgia
  - Trichostema gracile K.S. McClell. - Florida
  - Trichostema hobe K.S. McClell. - Florida (Martin County)
  - Trichostema latens K.S. McClell. - Florida (Franklin County)
  - Trichostema microphyllum K.S. McClell. - Florida
  - Trichostema nesophilum K.S. McClell. & Weakley – North Carolina, South Carolina
  - Trichostema setaceum Houtt. – eastern and south-central United States
  - Trichostema suffrutescens Kearney – Florida

== Phylogeny ==
The genus most closely related to Trichostema is Caryopteris. When taken together, these two genera largely fit the classic East Asian-Eastern North American disjunction.
