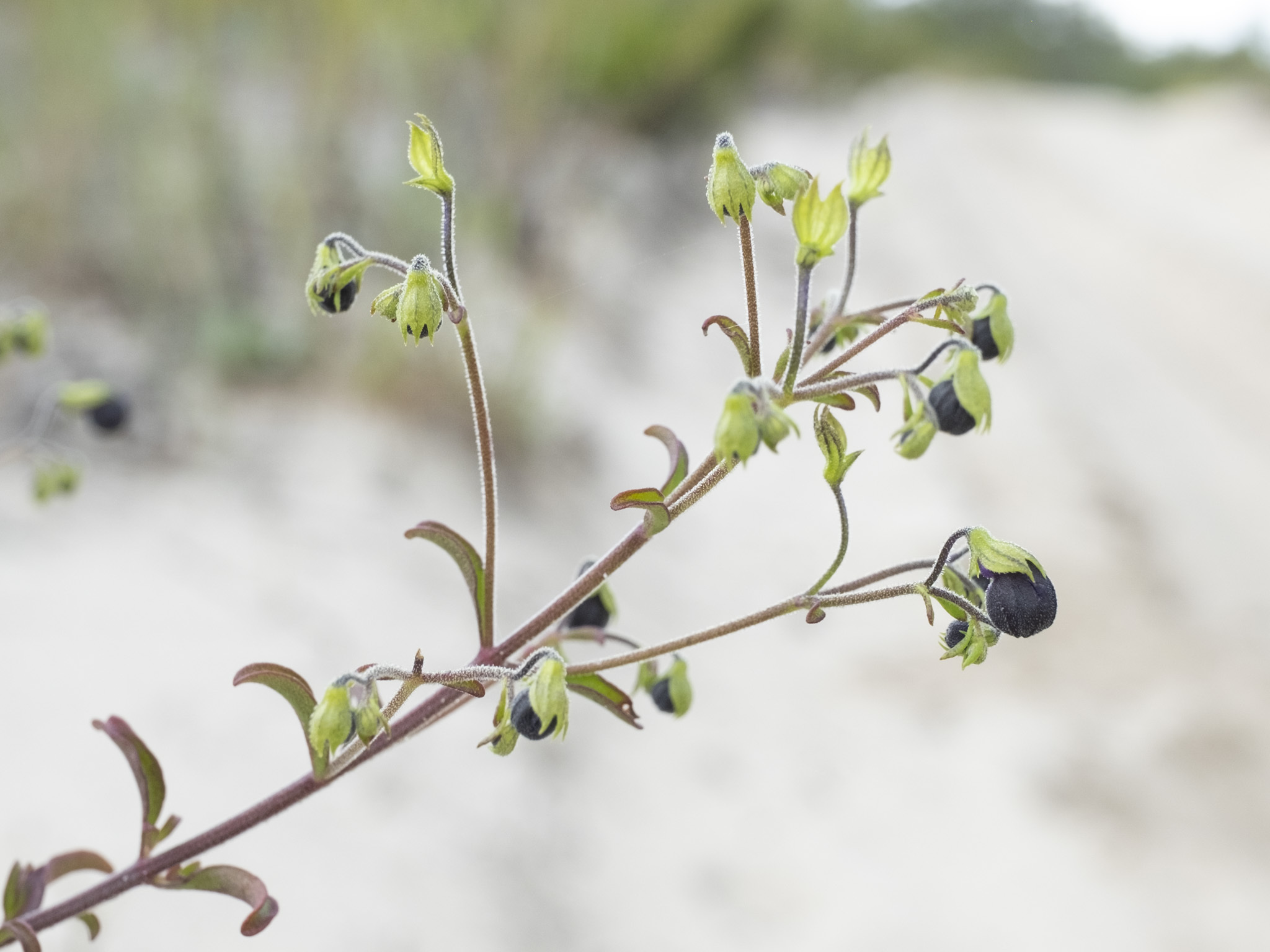

Conservation status
- Vulnerable (NatureServe)

Scientific classification
- Kingdom: Plantae
- Clade: Tracheophytes
- Clade: Angiosperms
- Clade: Eudicots
- Clade: Asterids
- Order: Lamiales
- Family: Lamiaceae
- Genus: Trichostema
- Species: T. microphyllum

Binomial name
- Trichostema microphyllum K.S.McClell.

= Trichostema microphyllum =

Species of flowering plant

Trichostema microphyllum is a species of flowering plant in the mint family (Lamiaceae). It is endemic to Florida in the southeastern United States, where it occurs in sandy, fire-maintained habitats. The species was described in 2023 as part of a taxonomic revision recognizing previously unrecognized diversity within North American members of the genus Trichostema.

== Taxonomy ==
Trichostema microphyllum was formally described by K.S. McClelland in 2023 in the journal Phytotaxa, based on morphological evidence distinguishing it from closely related species in the Trichostema dichotomum complex. The species is currently accepted by major taxonomic authorities, including Plants of the World Online.

== Description ==
Trichostema microphyllum is an aromatic herb with opposite leaves and square stems, characteristic of the mint family. As suggested by the specific epithet, the leaves are relatively small compared to those of closely related species. The flowers are bilaterally symmetrical and borne in axillary clusters, consistent with other members of the genus. Diagnostic morphological features separating the species from related taxa include characters of the leaves, calyx, and inflorescence, as detailed in the original description.

== Distribution and habitat ==
The species is endemic to Florida, where it is known from sandy upland habitats, including scrub and sandhill communities that are influenced by periodic fire. Its known distribution is restricted to the Brooksville Ridge and nearby sandy uplands in Florida, reflecting its habitat specialization.

== Conservation ==
Trichostema microphyllum is currently listed as G3 and S3 (Vulnerable) by NatureServe.

== Gallery ==
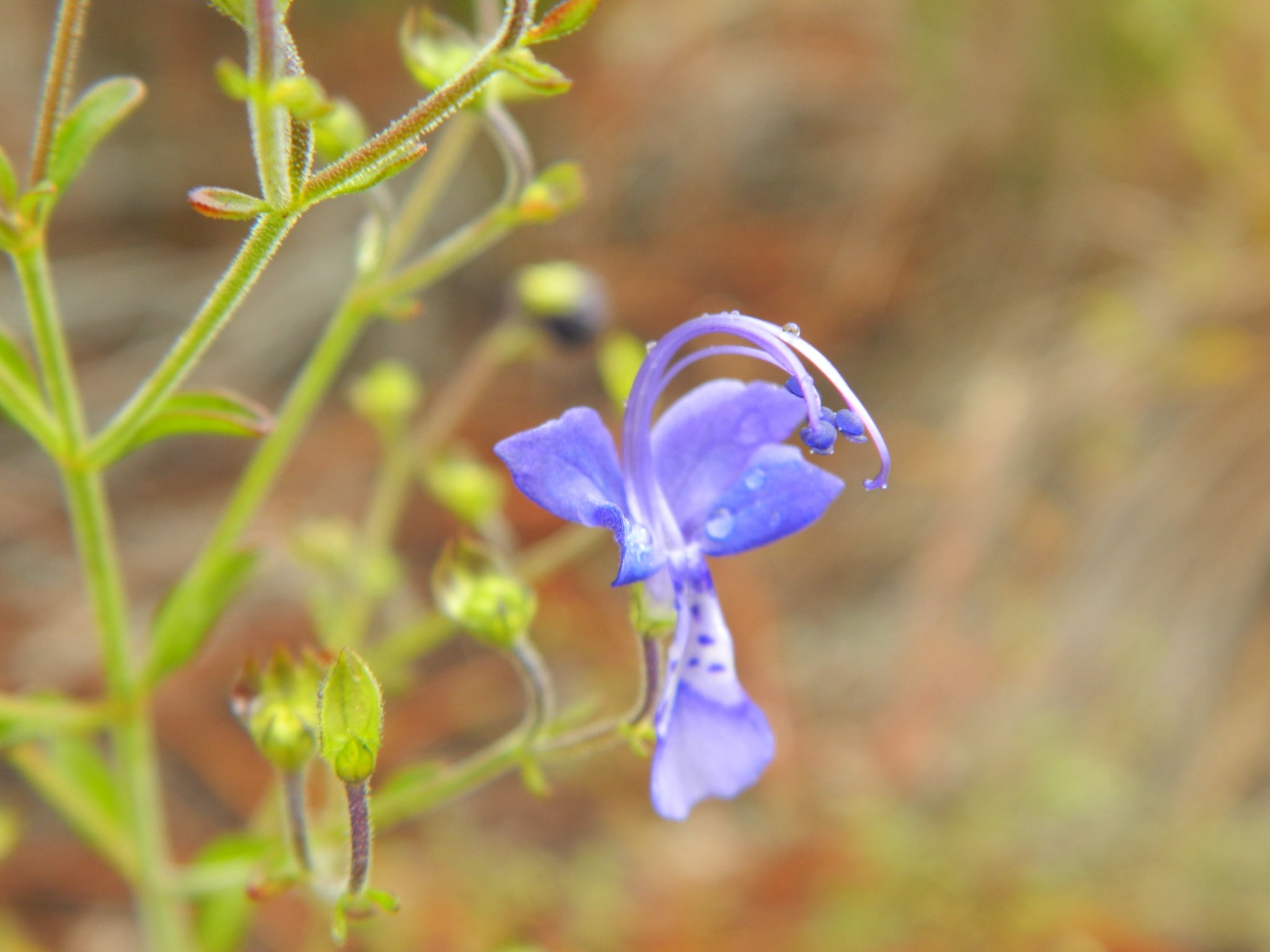
Flower

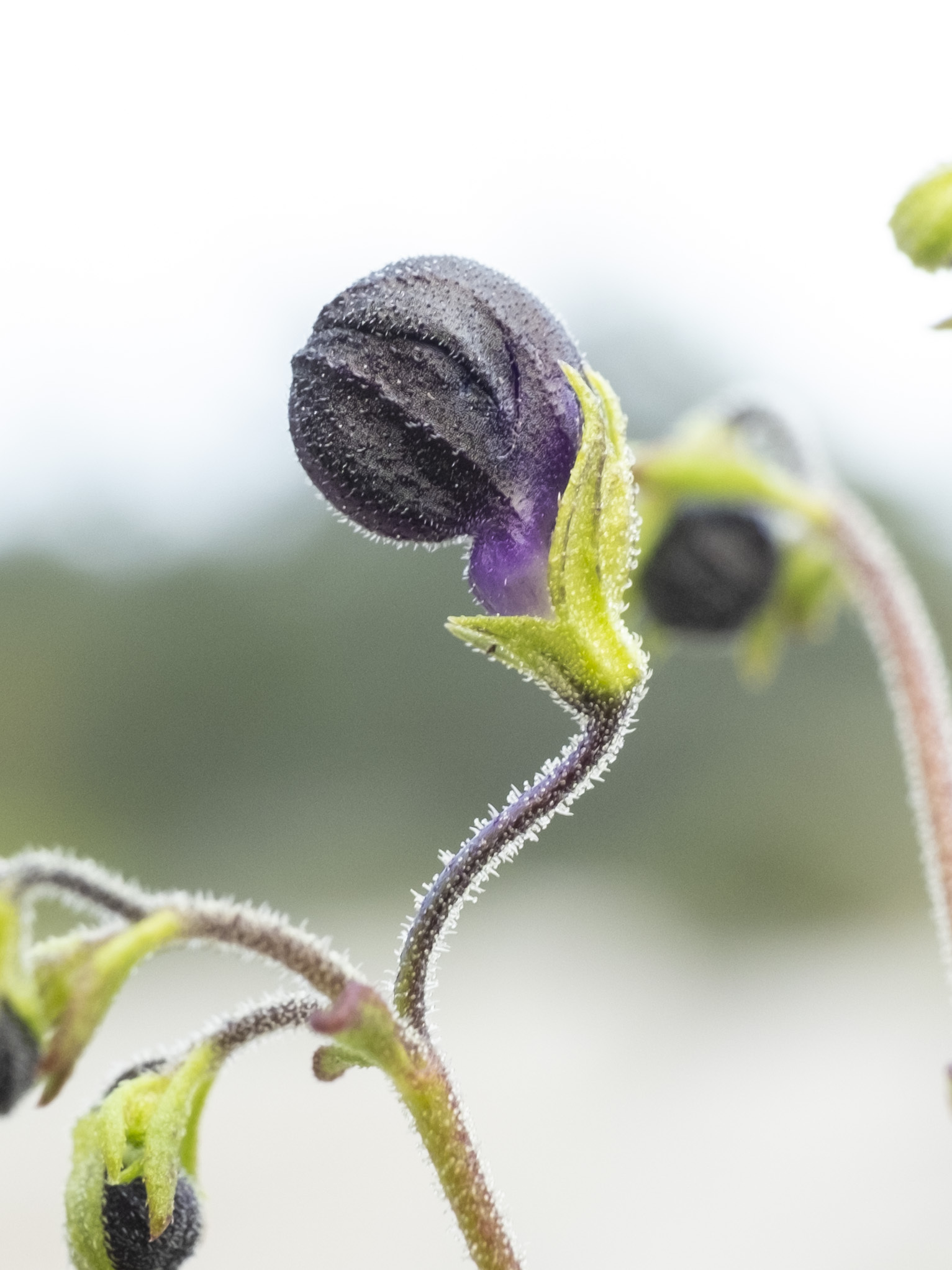
Budding flower

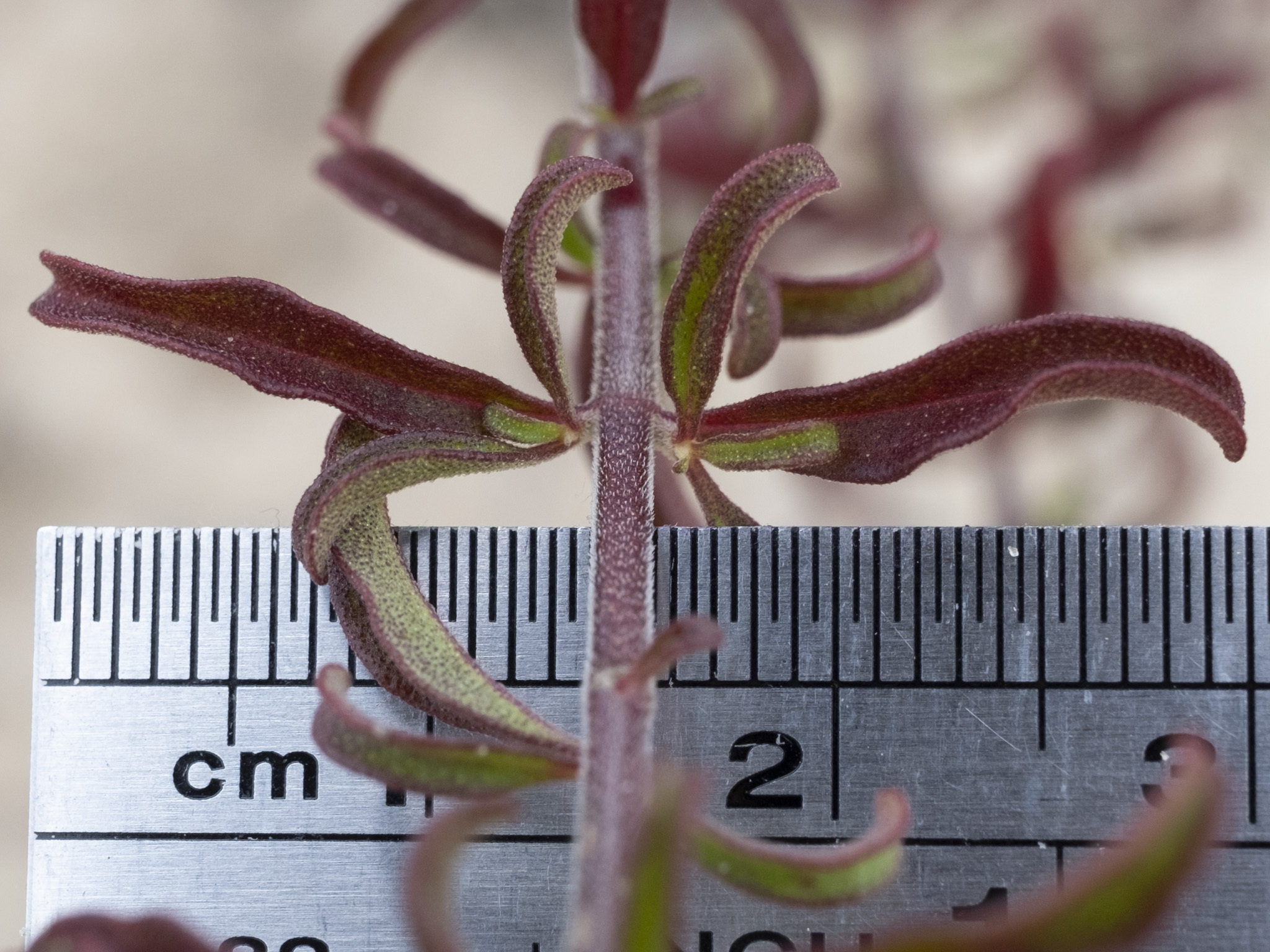
Leaves with scale

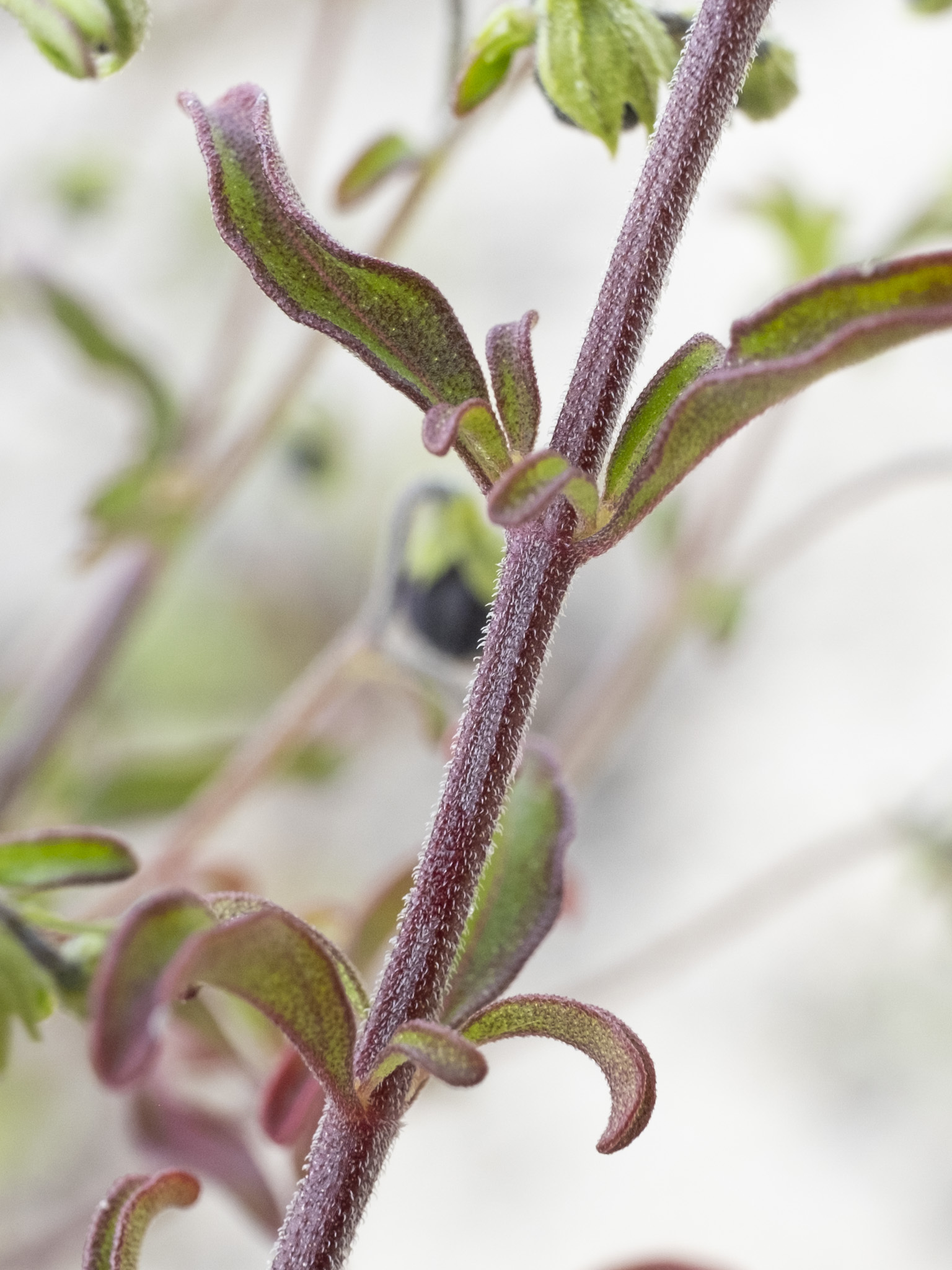
Stem

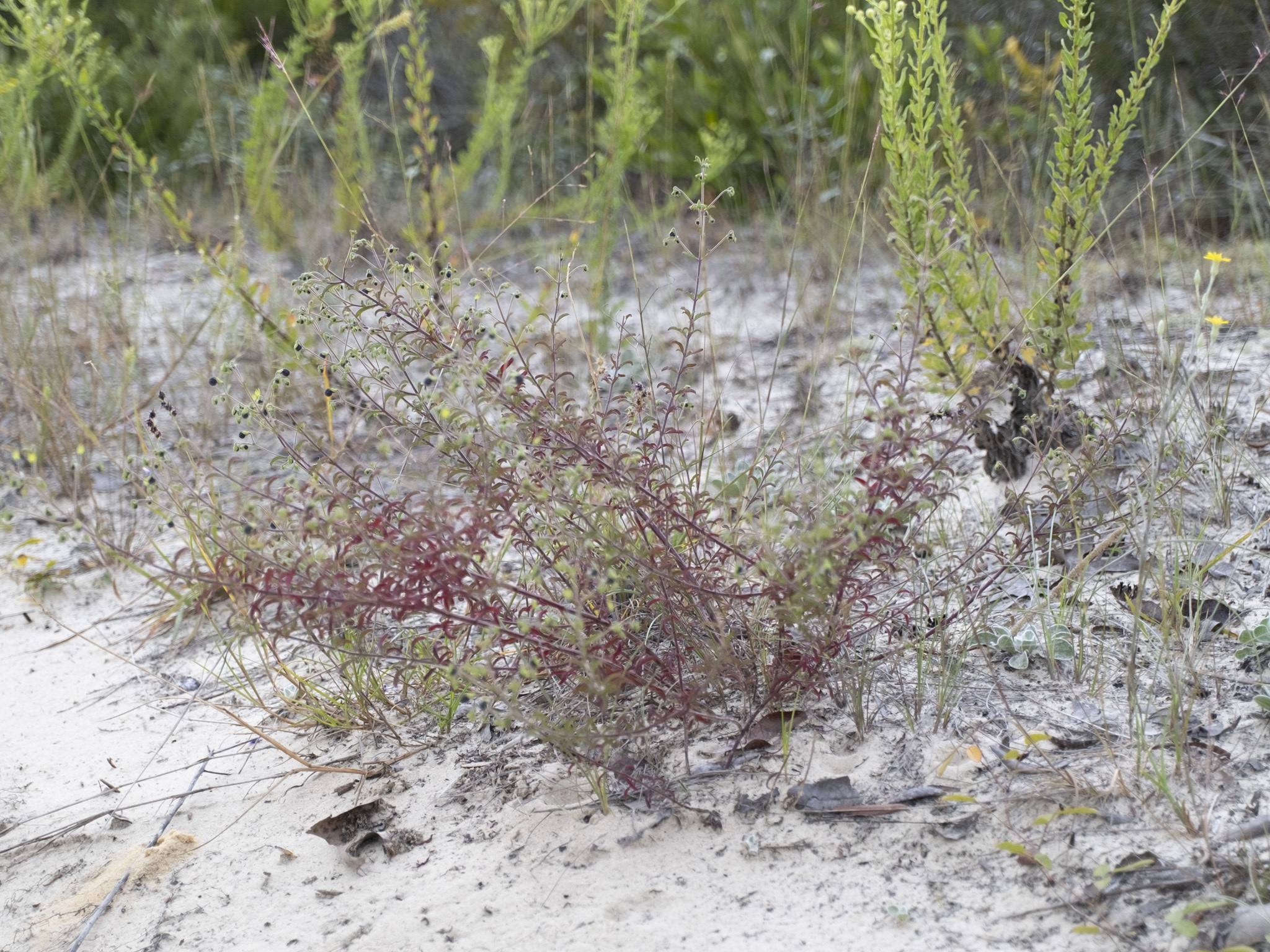
Whole plant

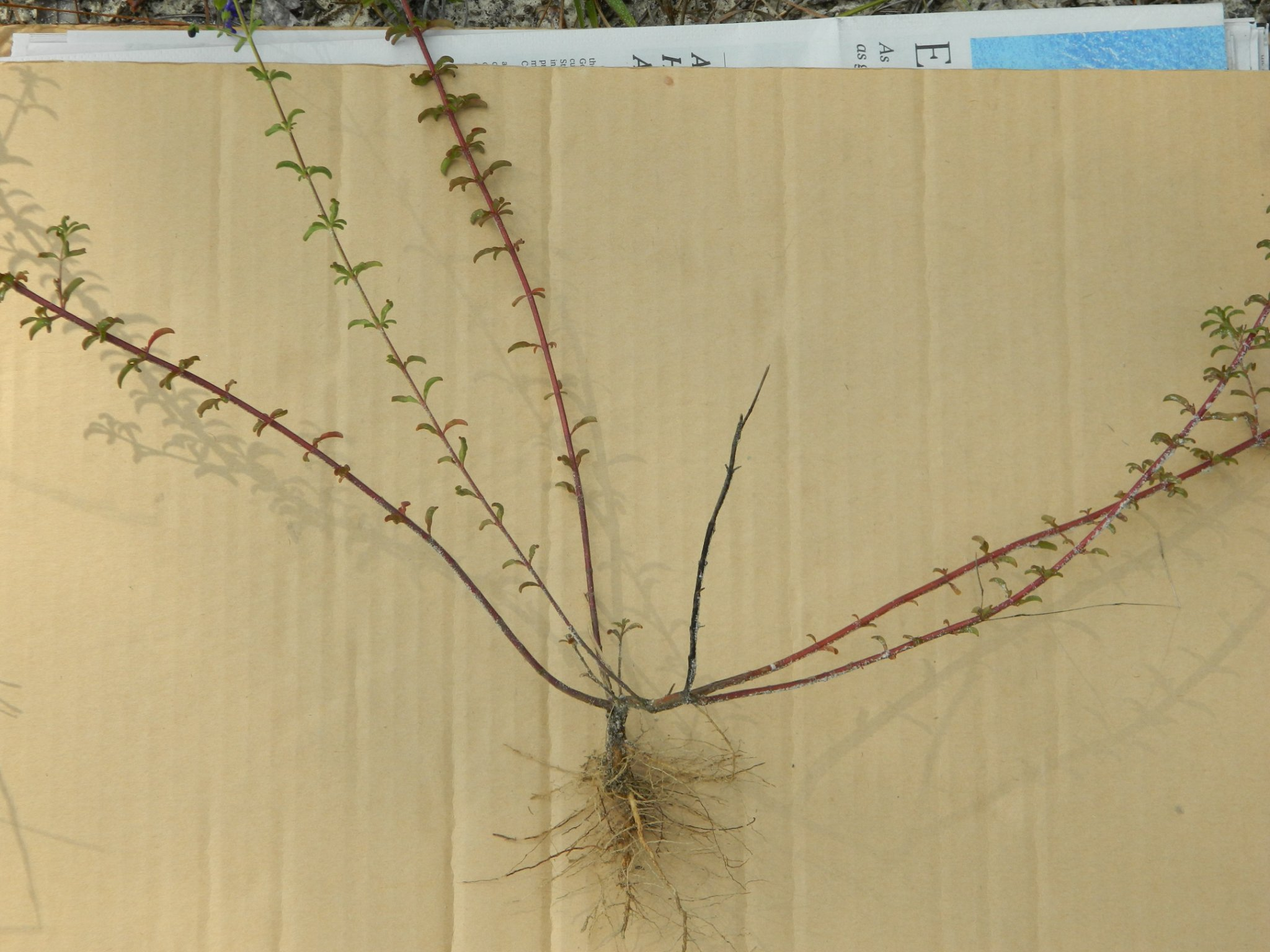
Type specimen
