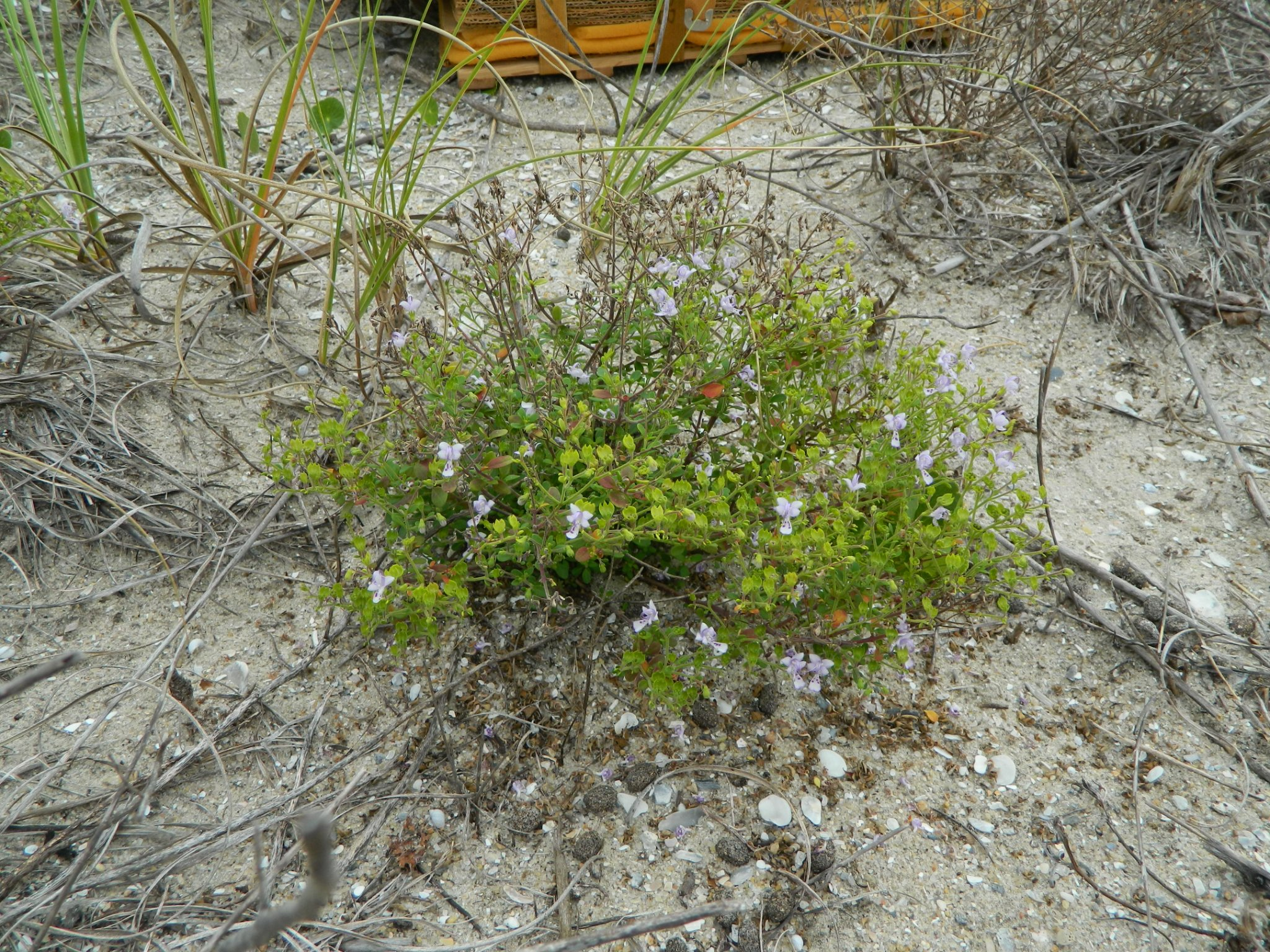

Conservation status
- Imperiled (NatureServe)

Scientific classification
- Kingdom: Plantae
- Clade: Tracheophytes
- Clade: Angiosperms
- Clade: Eudicots
- Clade: Asterids
- Order: Lamiales
- Family: Lamiaceae
- Genus: Trichostema
- Species: T. nesophilum

Binomial name
- Trichostema nesophilum K.S. McClell. & Weakley

= Trichostema nesophilum =

Species of flowering plant

Trichostema nesophilum, commonly known as dune blue curls, Bald Head blue curls, and Carolina blue curls, is a species of flowering plant endemic to coastal dune grasslands in the southeastern United States.

== Taxonomy ==
This species was first formally described in 2019 by R. Kevan S. McClelland and Alan S. Weakley in the Journal of the Botanical Research Institute of Texas. The specific epithet nesophilum is from the Greek for "island" and "loving", named for its habitat—barrier islands along the coasts of North Carolina and South Carolina.

== Description ==
Trichostema nesophilum is a short-lived, suffrutescent perennial herb. It has square stems and opposite leaves typical of the mint family (Lamiaceae). Its stems have both regular hairs and oil glands. The glands are aromatic when disturbed. While the morphology of the flowers and inflorescences comports with the genus Trichostema, the light pink-lavender corolla and yellow stamens of this species are unique to this section of the genus.

== Distribution and Habitat ==
This species inhabits coastal dune grasslands and barrens behind large established dune systems. It ranges from just north of Cape Hatteras, North Carolina, to Cape Romain, South Carolina.

== Conservation ==
Trichostema nesophilum is ranked as G2 (Imperiled) globally and S2 (Imperiled) for both North Carolina and South Carolina by NatureServe. Coastal development, hurricanes, and sea level rise are all threats to its populations. A petition was put forward for adding it to the endangered species list in the early 1990s (as Trichostema sp. nov./ined.).
