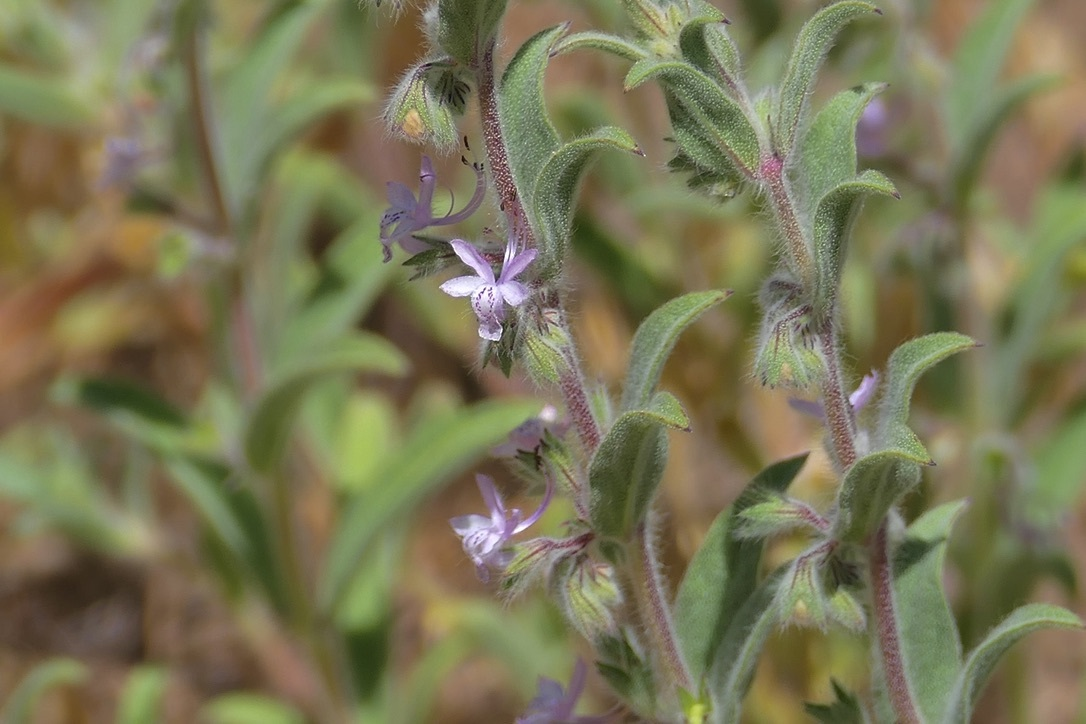

Conservation status
- Critically Imperiled (NatureServe)

Scientific classification
- Kingdom: Plantae
- Clade: Tracheophytes
- Clade: Angiosperms
- Clade: Eudicots
- Clade: Asterids
- Order: Lamiales
- Family: Lamiaceae
- Genus: Trichostema
- Species: T. ruygtii

Binomial name
- Trichostema ruygtii H.Lewis

= Trichostema ruygtii =

Species of flowering plant

Trichostema ruygtii, with the common name Napa bluecurls, is a species of flowering plant in the mint family. It was first described to science in 2006.

== Distribution ==
The plant is endemic to California in the northern San Francisco Bay Area, where it is known from the southern Mayacamas Mountains, in Napa County and into western Solano County.

Its habitats include chaparral, oak woodland, mixed evergreen forest, and vernal pools in grasslands.

== Description ==
Trichostema ruygtii is an annual herb that grows under 5 decimetres (1.6 ft) in height. The stems and lanceolate leaves have short hairs.

The flowers are a pale lavender in color. Its bloom period is June to October.

== Conservation ==
The species is threatened by agriculture and development. Trichostema ruygtii is listed as a Critically endangered species on the California Native Plant Society Inventory of Rare and Endangered Plants.
