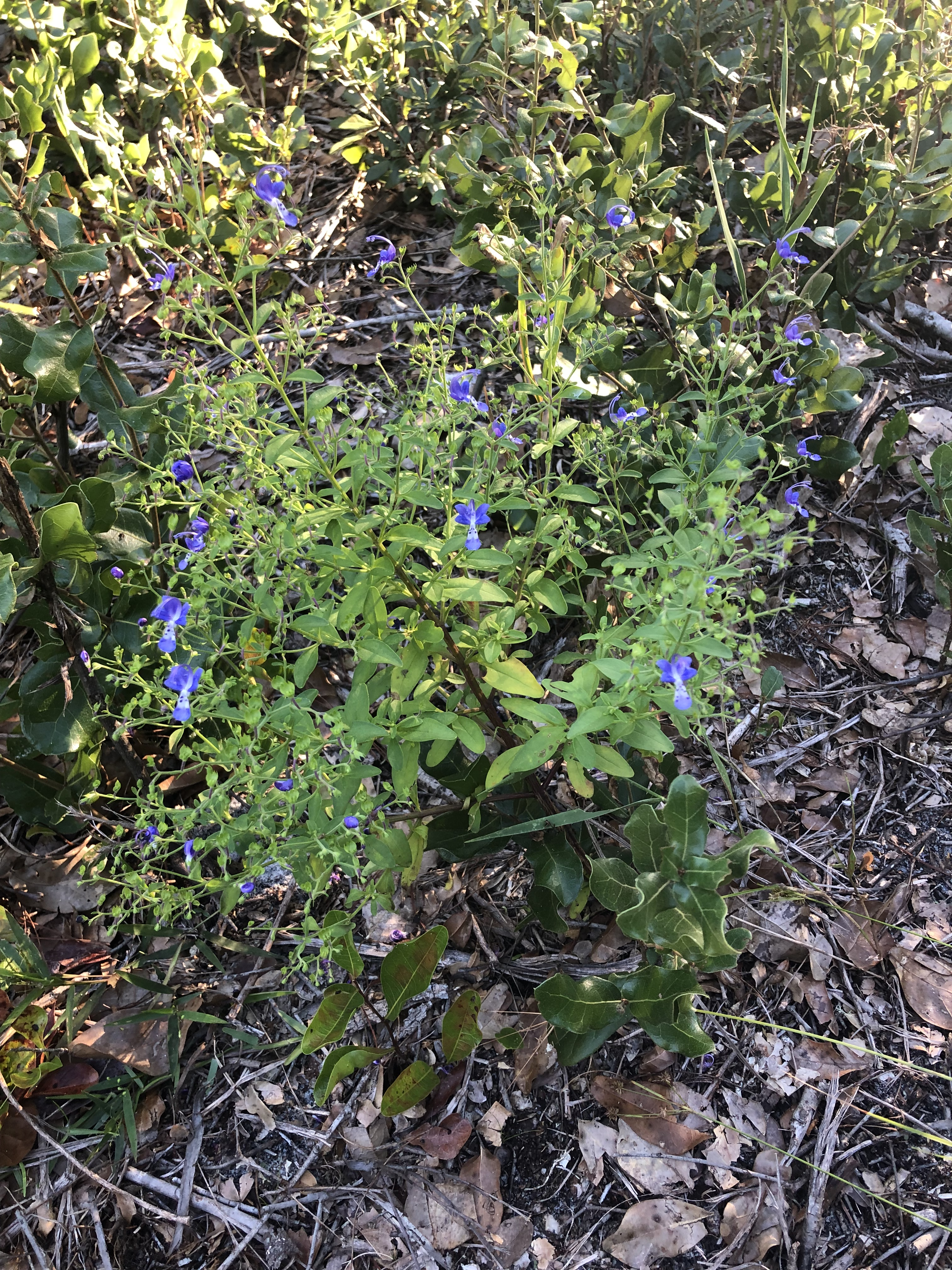

Conservation status
- Critically Imperiled (NatureServe)

Scientific classification
- Kingdom: Plantae
- Clade: Tracheophytes
- Clade: Angiosperms
- Clade: Eudicots
- Clade: Asterids
- Order: Lamiales
- Family: Lamiaceae
- Genus: Trichostema
- Species: T. latens

Binomial name
- Trichostema latens K.S.McClell.

= Trichostema latens =

Species of plant

Trichostema latens, commonly known as Hidden Bluecurls, is a species of flowering plant in the mint family (Lamiaceae). It is endemic to Florida in the southeastern United States.

== Description ==
Trichostema latens is a perennial herb with opposite leaves and bilaterally symmetrical flowers typical of the mint family. As in other species of Trichostema, the flowers are borne in axillary clusters and exhibit elongated stamens adapted for insect pollination, specifically by bees. Detailed morphological descriptions are provided in regional floras and taxonomic treatments of the genus.

== Distribution and habitat ==
The species is endemic to Franklin County, Florida and is known from only a handful of populations. It is thought to be associated with scrubby flatwoods and similar habitats.

== Conservation ==
Trichostema latens is ranked as G1 and S1 (Critically Imperiled) by NatureServe. Threats to the current populations combined with small population number and size led the Center for Biological Diversity and Kevan Schoonover McClelland to submit a petition to add this species to the endangered species list in December, 2024.
