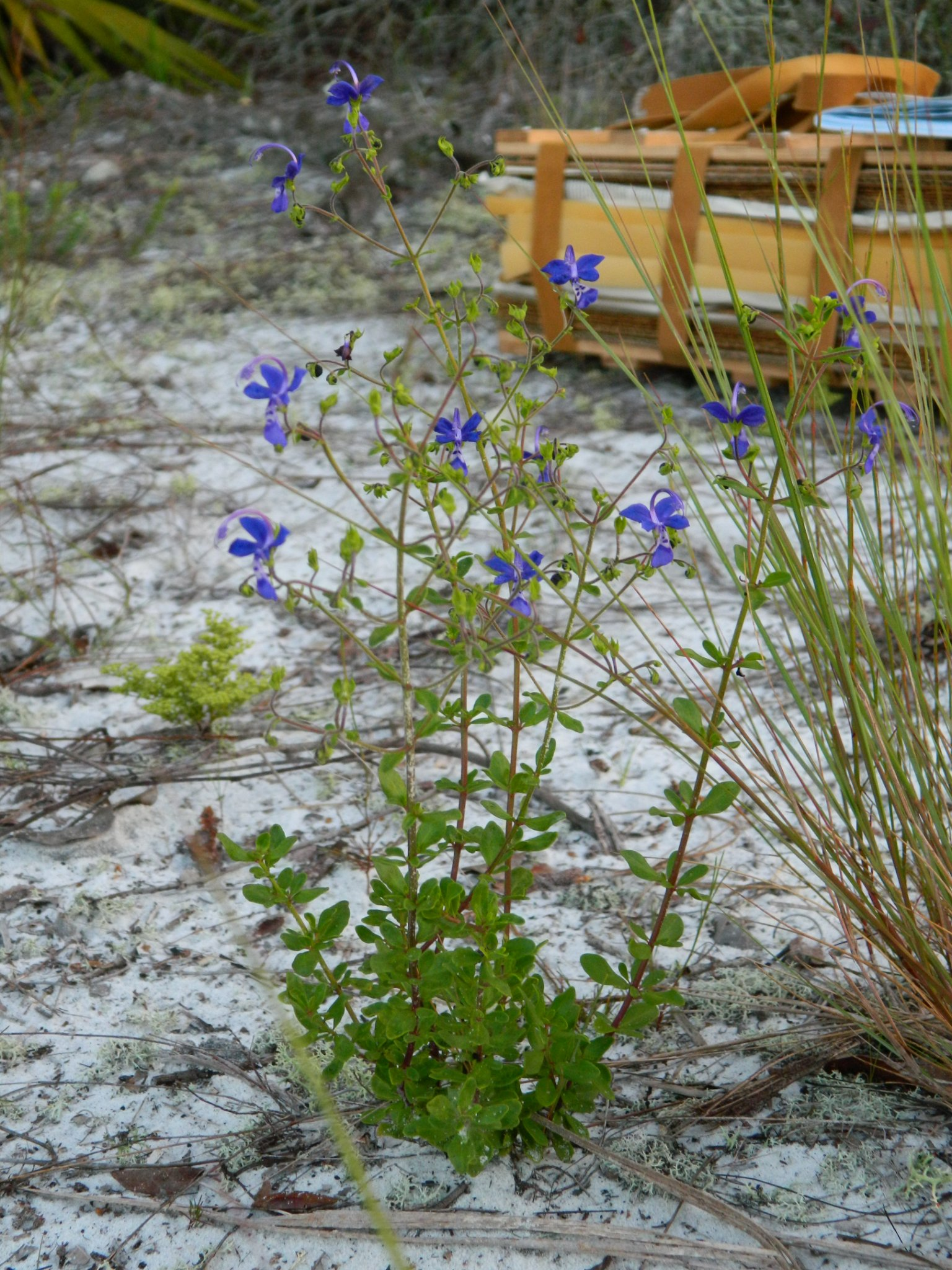

Conservation status
- Imperiled (NatureServe)

Scientific classification
- Kingdom: Plantae
- Clade: Tracheophytes
- Clade: Angiosperms
- Clade: Eudicots
- Clade: Asterids
- Order: Lamiales
- Family: Lamiaceae
- Genus: Trichostema
- Species: T. bridgesii-orzellii

Binomial name
- Trichostema bridgesii-orzellii K.S.McClell.

= Trichostema bridgesii-orzellii =

Species of plant

Trichostema bridgesii-orzellii, commonly known as Bridges' and Orzell's Bluecurls or Lake Wales Ridge Bluecurls, is a species of flowering plant in the mint family (Lamiaceae). It is endemic to peninsular Florida in the southeastern United States, where it occurs in fire-maintained scrub and sandhill habitats. The species was described in 2023 as part of a taxonomic revision recognizing previously unrecognized diversity within North American members of the genus Trichostema.

== Taxonomy ==
Trichostema bridgesii-orzellii was formally described by K.S. McClelland in 2023 in the journal Phytotaxa, based on morphological, ecological, and molecular evidence distinguishing it from closely related species within the genus.

The specific epithet bridgesii-orzellii honors botanists Edwin L. Bridges and Steven L. Orzell for their contributions to the study and conservation of fire-dependent ecosystems in the southeastern United States.

== Description ==
Trichostema bridgesii-orzellii is an aromatic perennial herb characterized by opposite leaves and bilaterally symmetrical flowers typical of the Lamiaceae. As with other species of Trichostema, the flowers are borne in axillary clusters and adapted for insect pollination, specifically by bees.

== Distribution and habitat ==
The species is endemic to central and south-central Florida, with confirmed occurrences in Highlands, Osceola, and Polk counties, primarily on the Lake Wales Ridge.

It inhabits open, sandy environments including Florida scrub and sandhill communities, where periodic fire plays an important role in maintaining suitable habitat structure.

== Conservation ==
Although formally described only recently, T. bridgesii-orzellii is associated with habitats that have experienced extensive historical loss and fragmentation. This species is currently ranked S2S3 (Imperiled or Vulnerable) by the Florida Natural Areas Inventory (FNAI) and G2G3, rounded down to G2 (Imperiled), by NatureServe.

== Gallery ==
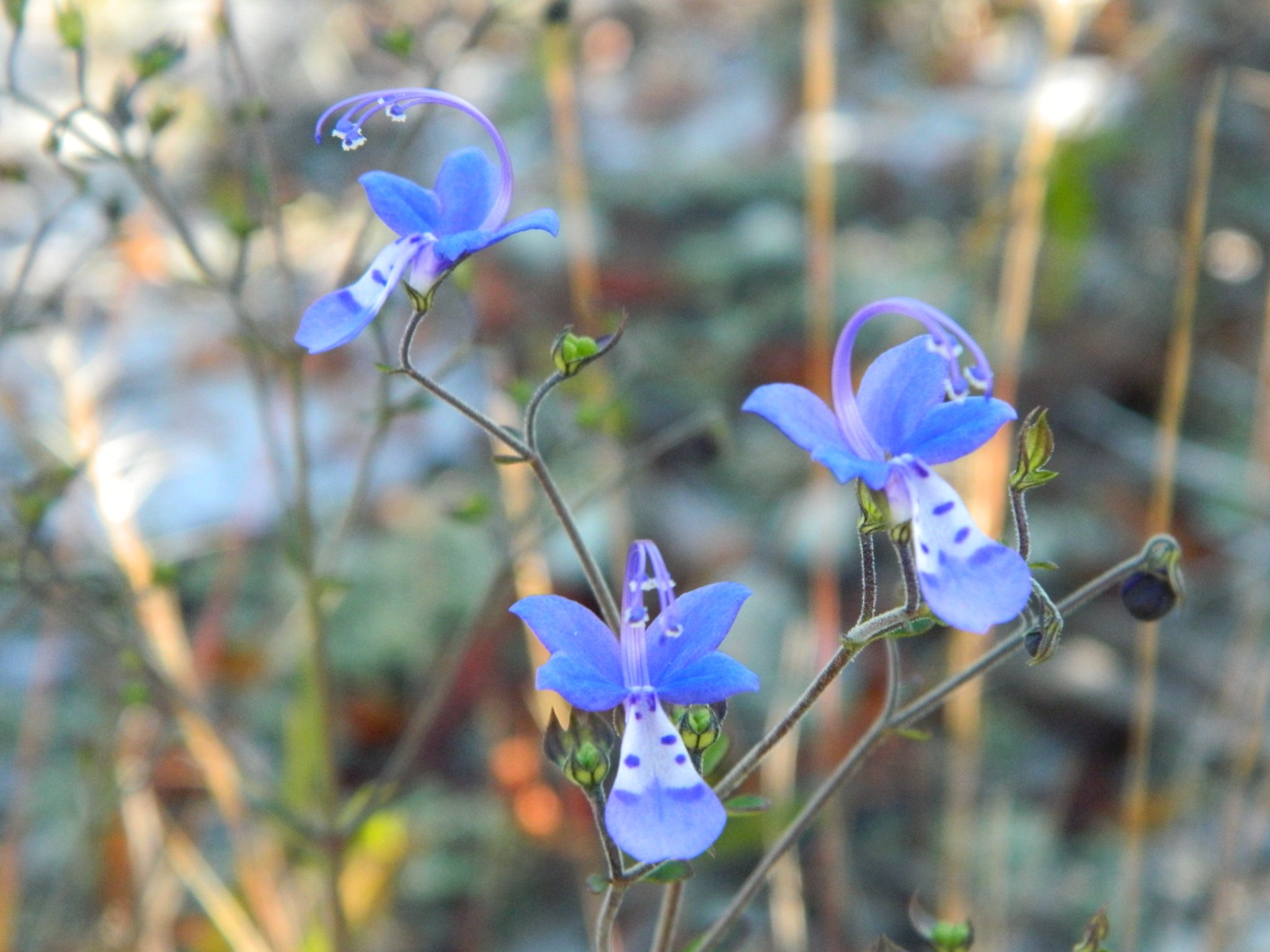
Flowers

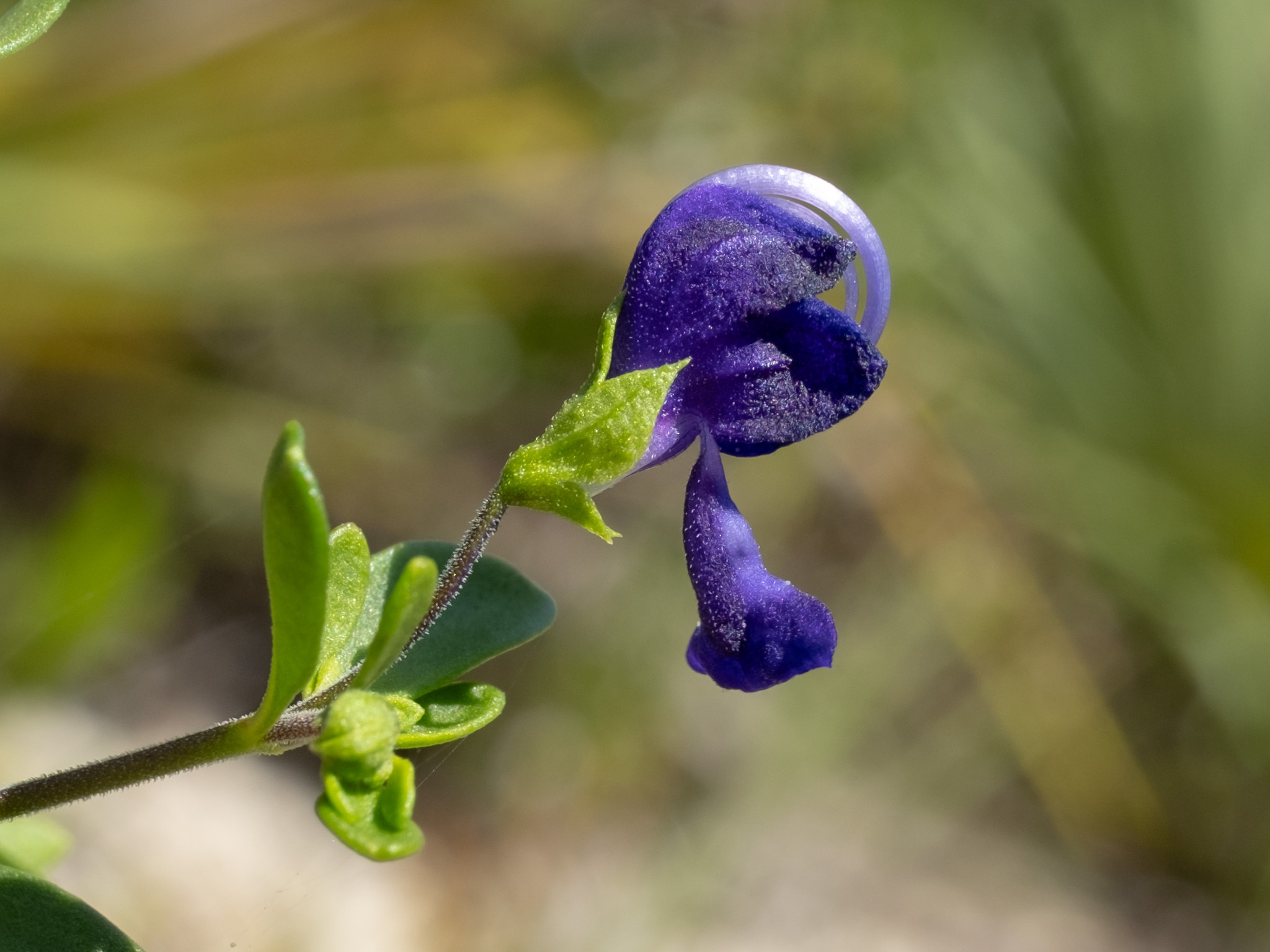
Calyx and corolla

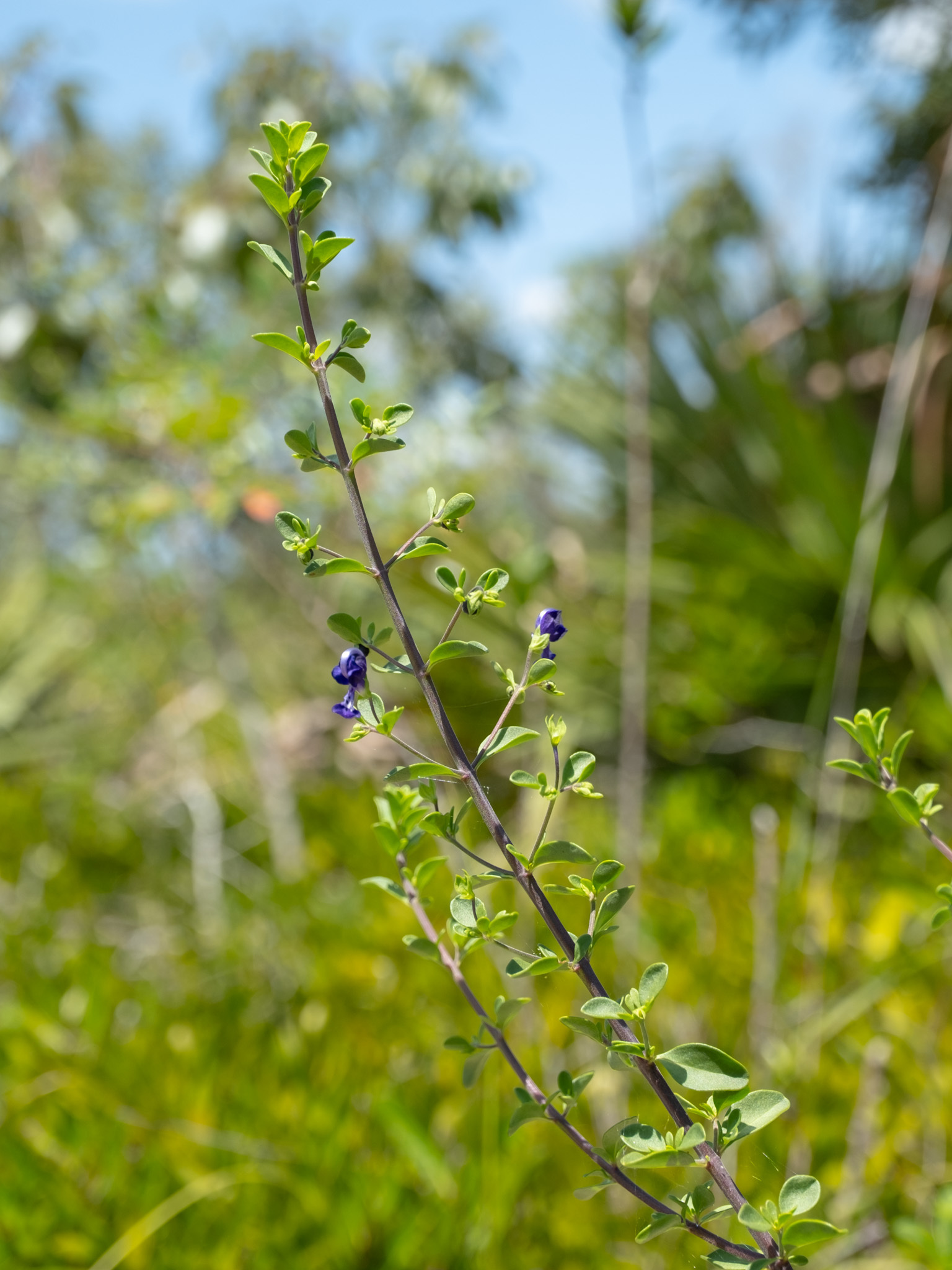
Inflorescence and leaves

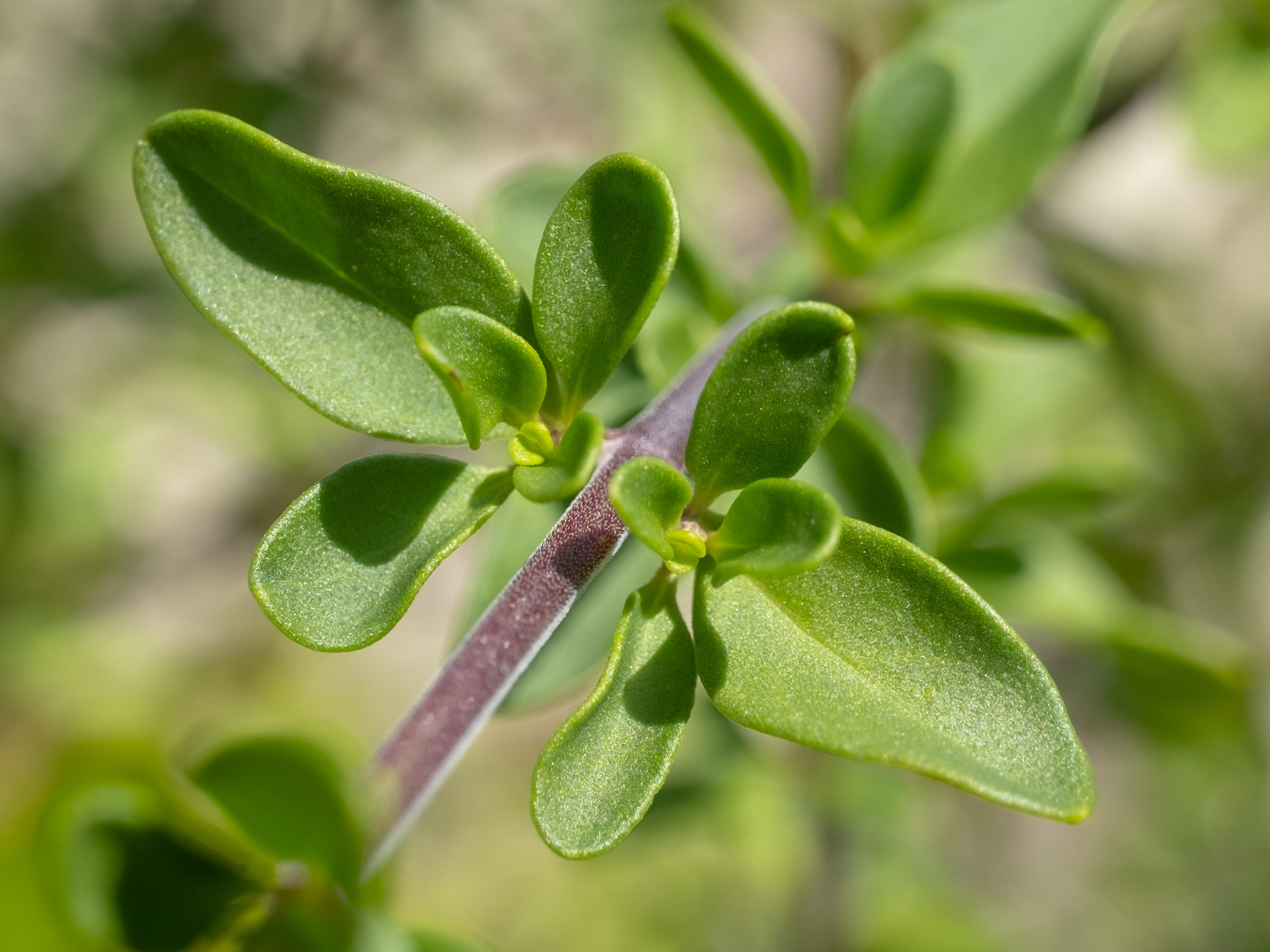
Leaves

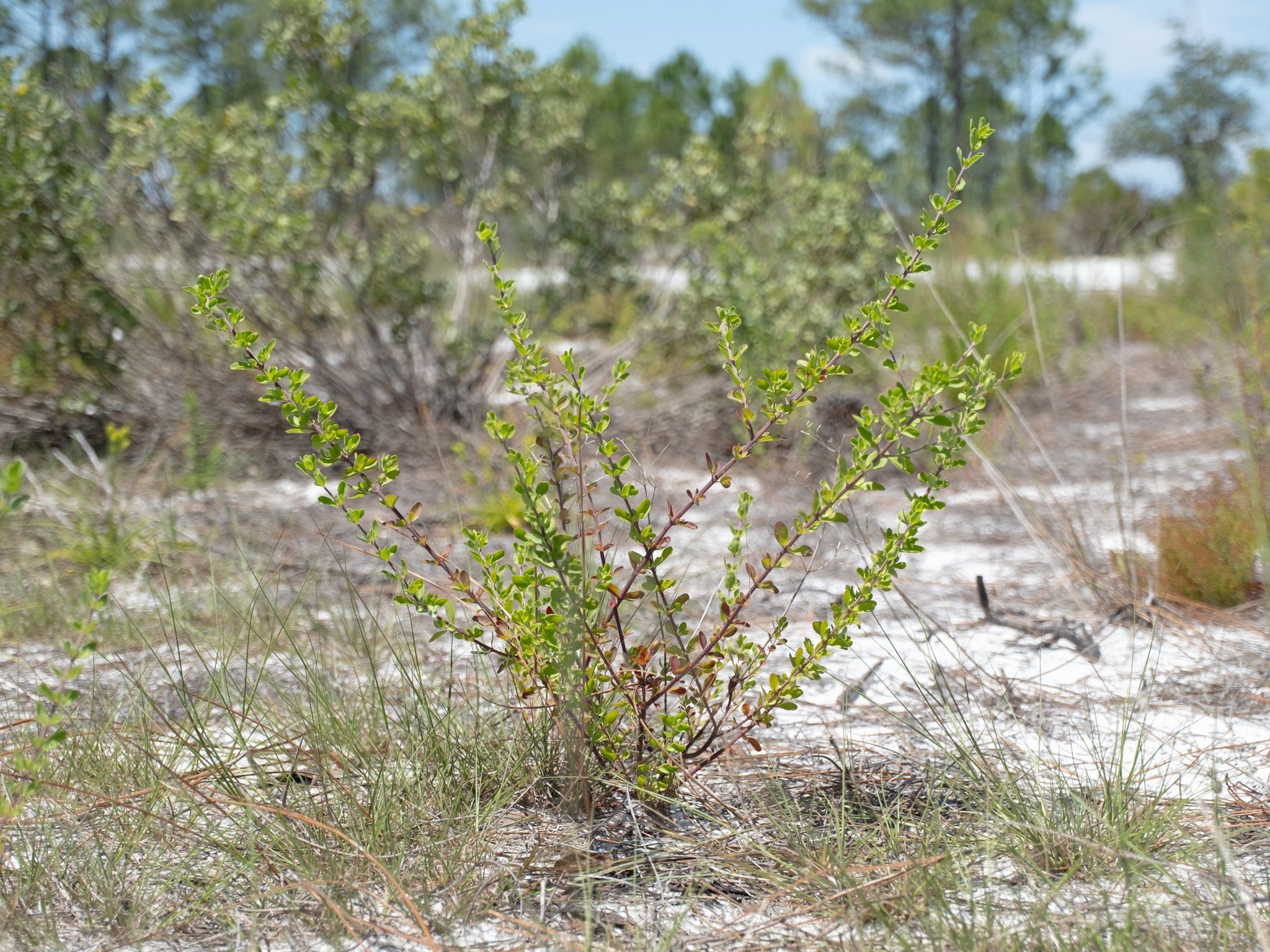
Whole plant
