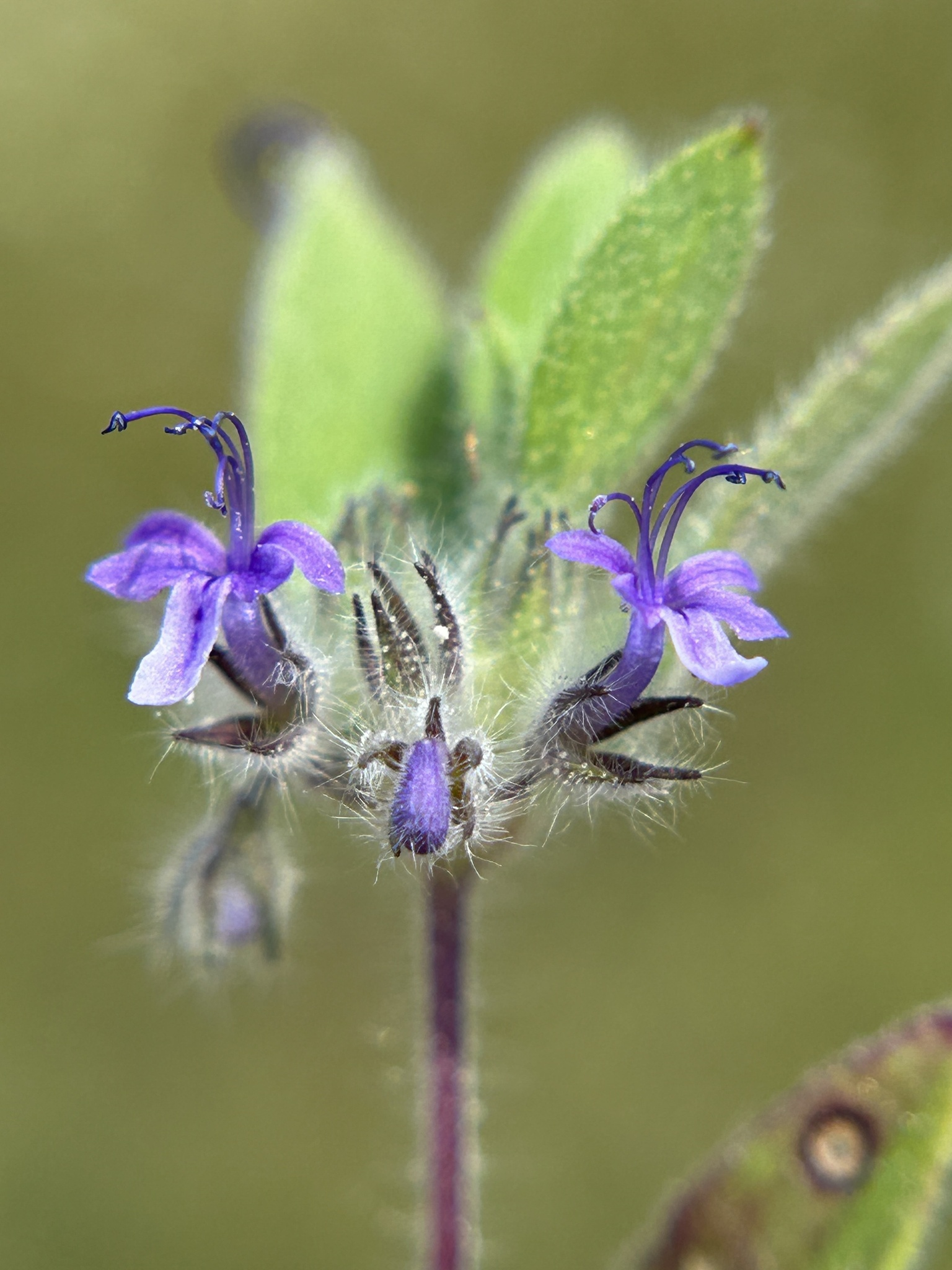

Conservation status
- Secure (NatureServe)

Scientific classification
- Kingdom: Plantae
- Clade: Tracheophytes
- Clade: Angiosperms
- Clade: Eudicots
- Clade: Asterids
- Order: Lamiales
- Family: Lamiaceae
- Genus: Trichostema
- Species: T. oblongum

Binomial name
- Trichostema oblongum Benth.

= Trichostema oblongum =

Species of flowering plant

Trichostema oblongum, known by the common names oblong bluecurls and mountain bluecurls, is a species of flowering plant in the mint family .

It is native to California and the Northwestern United States in Oregon, Idaho, and Washington, and north into British Columbia, Canada.

Its habitat includes dry margins of meadows and streambanks in Yellow pine forest, Red Fir Forest, Lodgepole pine Forest, Subalpine Forest, California mixed evergreen forest, and North Coastal Coniferous Forest plant communities. It grows at 100–3,000 metres (330–9,840 ft) in elevation.

== Description ==
Trichostema oblongum is an annual herb approaching fifty centimeters (20 in) in maximum height. Its aromatic foliage is coated in glandular and nonglandular hairs. The elongated or lance-shaped leaves are 2 to 4 centimeters (0.79 to 1.57 in).

The inflorescence is a series of clusters of flowers located at each leaf pair. Each flower has a hairy calyx of pointed sepals and a tubular, lipped purple corolla. The four curved stamens protrude from the lips of the flower.
