= Pancratium caribaeum =

Pancratium caribaeum is a scientific name for a plant which has been used as a synonym for:

- Hymenocallis caribaea, Caribbean spider-lily
- Hymenocallis speciosa, green-tinge spiderlily
