= Hymenocallis caroliniana =

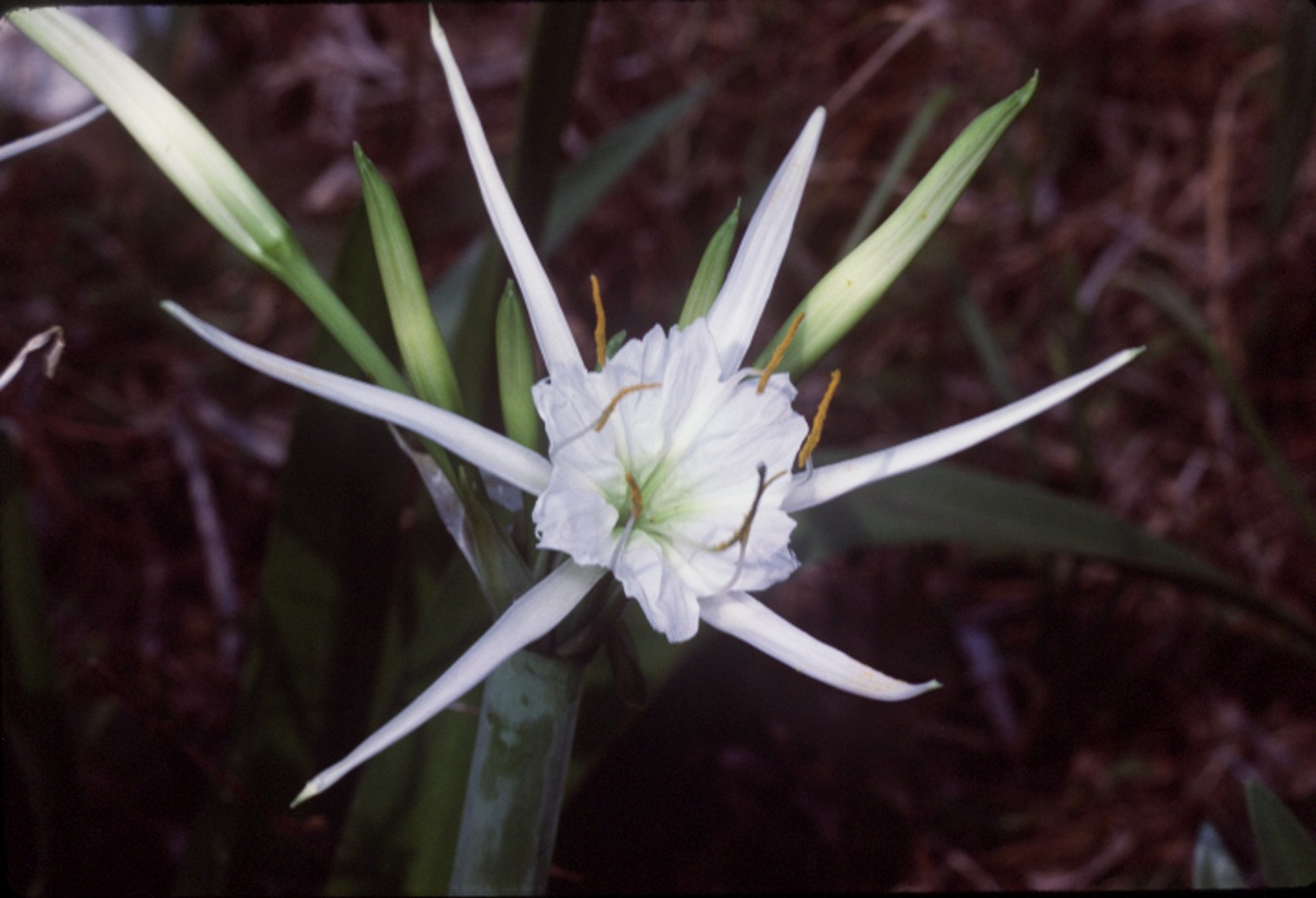

Hymenocallis caroliniana is a scientific name for a plant which has been used as a synonym for:

- Hymenocallis occidentalis, northern spider-lily – incorrect synonym
- Pancratium maritimum, sea daffodil – correct synonym
