= Hymenocallis proterantha =

Scientific classification
- Kingdom: Plantae
- Clade: Tracheophytes
- Clade: Angiosperms
- Clade: Monocots
- Order: Asparagales
- Family: Amaryllidaceae
- Subfamily: Amaryllidoideae
- Genus: Hymenocallis
- Species: H. proterantha

Binomial name
- Hymenocallis proterantha Bauml

Species of flowering plant

Hymenocallis proterantha is a species of spider lily known only from Mexico (States of Colima, Jalisco, Michoacán, Nayarit).
