= Hymenocallis howardii =

Scientific classification
- Kingdom: Plantae
- Clade: Tracheophytes
- Clade: Angiosperms
- Clade: Monocots
- Order: Asparagales
- Family: Amaryllidaceae
- Subfamily: Amaryllidoideae
- Genus: Hymenocallis
- Species: H. howardii

Binomial name
- Hymenocallis howardii Bauml

Species of flowering plant

Hymenocallis howardii is a species of spider-lily, native to southwestern Mexico. It is known from the states of Nayarit, Colima, Guerrero, Jalisco, Michoacan, and Oaxaca. It is smaller than most other members of the genus, with scapes only about 60 cm tall. The species is named in honor of its discoverer, the late Thad Howard of Texas.
