= Leptochiton =

Leptochiton may refer to:

- Leptochiton (chiton), a prehistoric genus of chitons in the family Leptochitonidae
- Leptochiton (plant), a genus of plants in the family Amaryllidaceae
