= Hymenocallis pumila =

Scientific classification
- Kingdom: Plantae
- Clade: Tracheophytes
- Clade: Angiosperms
- Clade: Monocots
- Order: Asparagales
- Family: Amaryllidaceae
- Subfamily: Amaryllidoideae
- Genus: Hymenocallis
- Species: H. pumila

Binomial name
- Hymenocallis pumila Bauml

Species of flowering plant

Hymenocallis pumila is a species of spider lily native to the States of Jalisco and Colima in western Mexico.
