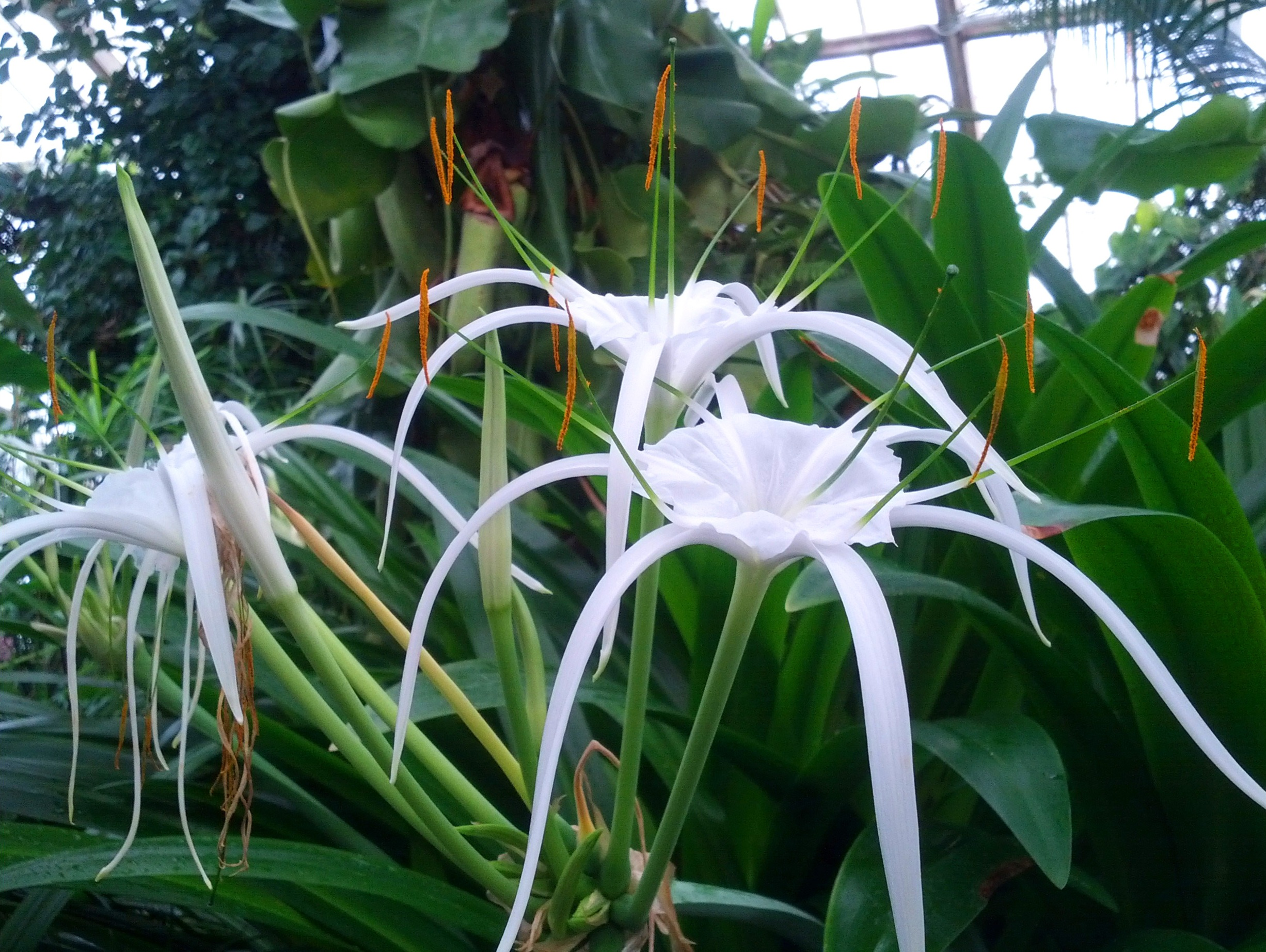
- Hymenocallis caribaea flower

Scientific classification
- Kingdom: Plantae
- Clade: Tracheophytes
- Clade: Angiosperms
- Clade: Monocots
- Order: Asparagales
- Family: Amaryllidaceae
- Subfamily: Amaryllidoideae
- Genus: Hymenocallis; Salisb.

Type species
- Hymenocallis littoralis (Jacq.) Salisb.

Synonyms
- Liriopsis Rchb.; Choretis Herb.; Nemepiodon Raf.; Siphotoma Raf.; Tomodon Raf.; Troxistemon Raf.

= Hymenocallis =

Spider lily Temporal range: 24.46 –0 Ma Late Oligocene – Recent

Genus of flowering plants

Hymenocallis /ˌhaɪmɪnəˈkælɪs/ (US) or /ˌhaɪmɛnoʊˈkælɪs/ (UK) is a genus of flowering plants in the Amaryllidaceae family native to the Americas. Hymenocallis contains more than 60 species of herbaceous, bulbous perennials native to the southeastern United States, Mexico, Central America, the Caribbean, and northern South America.

Some species are cultivated as ornamentals in warm nations around the globe, and a few have become naturalized in parts of Africa and on various tropical islands. Many of the species from the Caribbean and from the southeastern United States inhabit wet areas such as marshes, streambanks, and seashores. Some species even have floating seeds. Some of the Mexican species, in contrast, grow on grassy slopes in hills and mountains.

The flower stalks arise from basal rosettes of strap-shaped leaves. The terminal clusters of fragrant flowers are green, white or yellow, and can be large and spectacular. The genus name is derived from the Greek words ὑμήν (hymen), meaning 'membrane', and καλός (kalos), meaning 'beautiful'. It refers to the membranous tissue connecting the basal part of the stamens which forms shallow cup. The effect is of a spidery daffodil or lily, thus explaining the common name spider lily.

== Taxonomy ==
The genus Hymenocallis was created by Richard Anthony Salisbury in 1812, when he separated out a number of species formerly placed in Pancratium, starting with Hymenocallis littoralis. The main reason for the separation was that the fruits have only two seeds in each locule. Salisbury explained the name as referring to the "beautiful membrane which connects the filaments."

=== Species ===
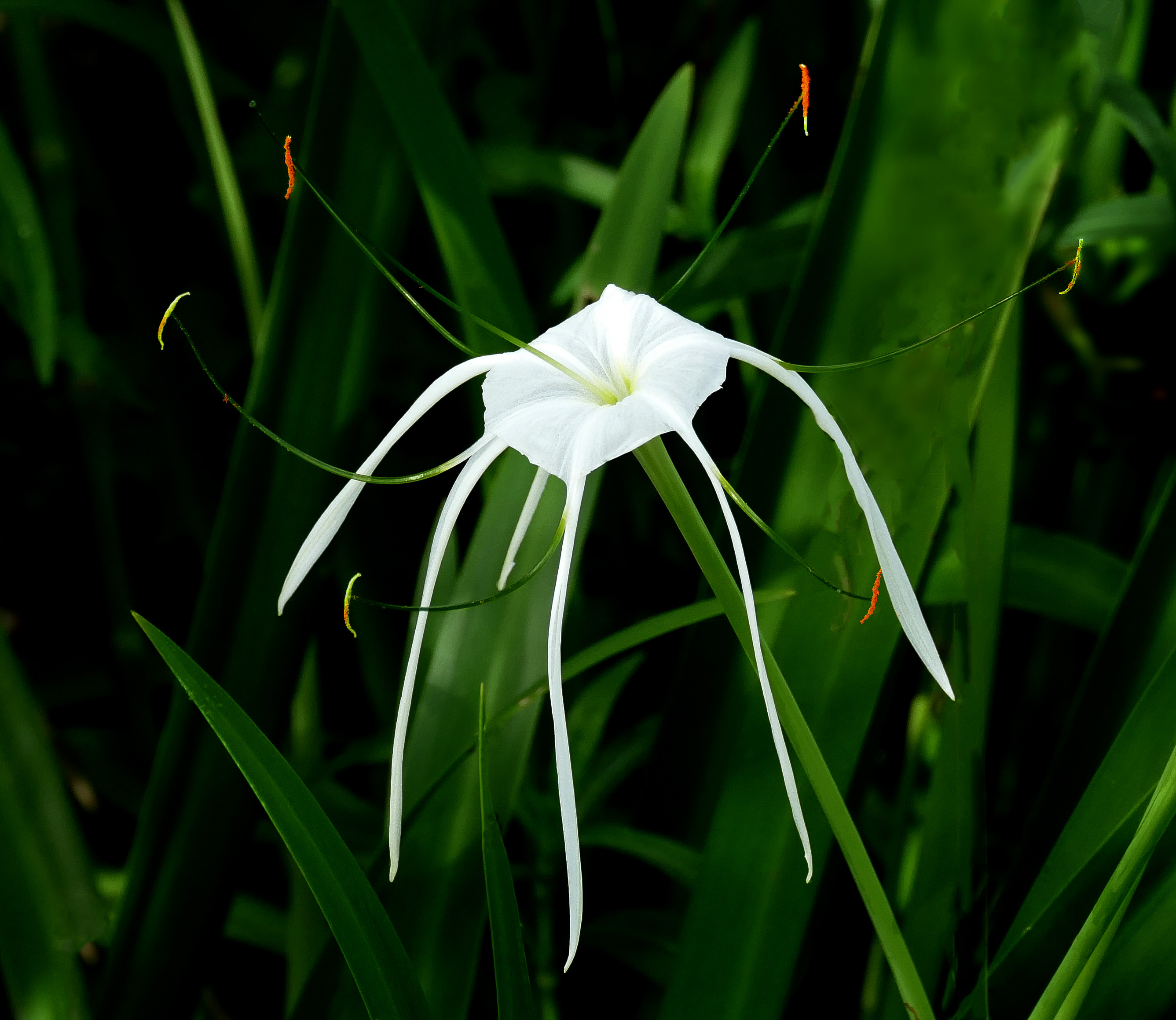
Texas spiderlily – Hymenocallis liriosme

As of January 2026, Plants of the World Online accepts the following 67 species:

- Hymenocallis acutifolia (Herb. ex Sims) Sweet
- Hymenocallis araniflora T.M.Howard
- Hymenocallis arenicola Northr.
- Hymenocallis astrostephana T.M.Howard
- Hymenocallis azteciana Traub
- Hymenocallis baumlii Ravenna
- Hymenocallis bolivariana Traub
- Hymenocallis caribaea (L.) Herb.
- Hymenocallis choctawensis Traub
- Hymenocallis choretis Hemsl.
- Hymenocallis cleo Ravenna
- Hymenocallis clivorum Laferr.
- Hymenocallis concinna Baker
- Hymenocallis cordifolia Micheli
- Hymenocallis coronaria (Leconte) Kunth
- Hymenocallis crassifolia Herb.
- Hymenocallis durangoensis T.M.Howard
- Hymenocallis duvalensis Traub ex Laferr.
- Hymenocallis eucharidifolia Baker
- Hymenocallis fragrans (Salisb.) Salisb.
- Hymenocallis franklinensis Ger.L.Sm., L.C.Anderson & Flory
- Hymenocallis gholsonii G.Lom.Sm. & Garland
- Hymenocallis gigantiflora Meerow
- Hymenocallis glauca (Zucc.) M.Roem.
- Hymenocallis godfreyi G.L.Sm. & Darst
- Hymenocallis graminifolia Greenm.
- Hymenocallis guatemalensis Traub
- Hymenocallis guerreroensis T.M.Howard
- Hymenocallis harrisiana Herb.
- Hymenocallis henryae Traub
- Hymenocallis howardii Bauml
- Hymenocallis imperialis T.M.Howard
- Hymenocallis incaica Ravenna
- Hymenocallis jaliscensis M.E.Jones
- Hymenocallis latifolia (Mill.) M.Roem.
- Hymenocallis leavenworthii (Standl. & Steyerm.) Bauml
- Hymenocallis lehmilleri T.M.Howard
- Hymenocallis limaensis Traub
- Hymenocallis liriosme (Raf.) Shinners
- Hymenocallis littoralis (Jacq.) Salisb.
- Hymenocallis lobata Klotzsch
- Hymenocallis longibracteata Hochr.
- Hymenocallis maximiliani T.M.Howard
- Hymenocallis multiflora Vargas
- Hymenocallis occidentalis (Leconte) Kunth
- Hymenocallis ornata (C.D.Bouché) M.Roem.
- Hymenocallis ovata (Mill.) M.Roem.
- Hymenocallis palmeri S.Watson
- Hymenocallis partita Ravenna
- Hymenocallis phalangidis Bauml
- Hymenocallis pimana Laferr.
- Hymenocallis portamonetensis Ravenna
- Hymenocallis praticola Britton & P.Wilson
- Hymenocallis proterantha Bauml
- Hymenocallis pumila Bauml
- Hymenocallis pygmaea Traub
- Hymenocallis rotata (Ker Gawl.) Herb.
- Hymenocallis ruenesiana J.J.Ancona, J.Tun & J.J.Ortiz-Diaz
- Hymenocallis schizostephana Worsley
- Hymenocallis sonorensis Standl.
- Hymenocallis speciosa (L.f. ex Salisb.) Salisb.
- Hymenocallis tridentata Small
- Hymenocallis tubiflora Salisb.
- Hymenocallis vasconcelosii García-Mend.
- Hymenocallis venezuelensis Traub
- Hymenocallis woelfleana T.M.Howard
- Hymenocallis ximixtlanensis J.Jiménez Ram., Cruz Durán & E.García-Gran.

Formerly included

Numerous names have been coined for species once considered members of Hymenocallis but now regarded as better suited to other genera. Most of the species are native to South America. Such genera include Clinanthus, Eucharis, Ismene, Leptochiton and Pancratium. Below are some examples of these species:

- Hymenocallis amancaes - Ismene amancaes
- Hymenocallis andreana - Leptochiton quitoensis
- Hymenocallis bonplandii - Eucharis bonplandii
- Hymenocallis calathina - Ismene narcissiflora
- Hymenocallis caroliniana - Pancratium maritimum
- Hymenocallis hawkesii - Ismene hawkesii
- Hymenocallis heliantha - Leptochiton helianthus
- Hymenocallis lacera - Pancratium maritimum
- Hymenocallis longipetala - Ismene longipetala
- Hymenocallis macleana - Ismene pedunculata
- Hymenocallis maritima - Pancratium maritimum
- Hymenocallis morrisonii - Ismene morrisonii
- Hymenocallis narcissiflora - Ismene narcissiflora
- Hymenocallis nutans - Ismene nutans
- Hymenocallis pedunculata - Ismene pedunculata
- Hymenocallis quitoensis - Leptochiton quitoensis
- Hymenocallis ringens - Ismene ringens
- Hymenocallis ruizii - Pancratium maritimum
- Hymenocallis sublimis - Ismene sublimis
- Hymenocallis tenuifolia - Leptochiton quitoensis
- Hymenocallis vargasii - Ismene vargasii
- Hymenocallis velardei - Ismene longipetala
- Hymenocallis virescens - Ismene pedunculata
- Hymenocallis viridiflora - Clinanthus viridiflorus

== Phylogeny ==
It is closely related to Ismene, to which it shared a common ancestor 26.14 million years ago. It is the sister group to Leptochiton, from which it separated 24.46 million years ago.

- Hymenocallideae
  - - Hymenocallis
    - Leptochiton
  - Ismene

== Cultivation ==
Most Hymenocallis must be grown in a warm greenhouse or in a sheltered sunny spot where the ground does not freeze. The North American species H. occidentalis is found as far north as southwestern Indiana where winters can reach 0 °F (−18 °C). They like good drainage and grow well in a soil rich with organic matter. The following species and hybrids are found in cultivation:-

- H. caribaea
- H. harrisiana
- H. littoralis
- H. × macrostephana
- H. speciosa

== See also ==
- List of plants known as lily
