= Hymenocallis tridentata =

Florida spider-lily

Scientific classification
- Kingdom: Plantae
- Clade: Tracheophytes
- Clade: Angiosperms
- Clade: Monocots
- Order: Asparagales
- Family: Amaryllidaceae
- Subfamily: Amaryllidoideae
- Genus: Hymenocallis
- Species: H. tridentata

Binomial name
- Hymenocallis tridentata Small

Synonyms
- Hymenocallis traubii Moldenke

Species of flowering plant

Hymenocallis tridentata, the Florida spider-lily, is a bulb-forming herb native to southern Florida, to about as far north as Vero Beach. The species grows in marshes and wet prairies very close to sea level. It is similar to H. rotata, but somewhat smaller.

Hymenocallis tridentata is a bulb-forming perennial. Leaves are narrowly linear, up to 50 cm long, deep green. Scape is up to 30 cm tall, with an umbel of 2 flowers. Flowers are white, fragrant; stamanial cup up to 7 cm across, with uneven teeth along the edge.
