= Liriopsis (plant) =

Liriopsis is a name that has been given to two plant genera:

- Liriopsis Rchb. is a synonym of Hymenocallis
- Liriopsis Spach is a synonym of Magnolia

(There is also an isopod genus Liriopsis.)
