= Hymenocallis phalangidis =

Scientific classification
- Kingdom: Plantae
- Clade: Tracheophytes
- Clade: Angiosperms
- Clade: Monocots
- Order: Asparagales
- Family: Amaryllidaceae
- Subfamily: Amaryllidoideae
- Genus: Hymenocallis
- Species: H. phalangidis

Binomial name
- Hymenocallis phalangidis Bauml

Species of flowering plant

Hymenocallis phalangidis is a species of spider lily known only from the Mexican state of Nayarit.
