= Hymenocallis franklinensis =

Scientific classification
- Kingdom: Plantae
- Clade: Embryophytes
- Clade: Tracheophytes
- Clade: Angiosperms
- Clade: Monocots
- Order: Asparagales
- Family: Amaryllidaceae
- Subfamily: Amaryllidoideae
- Genus: Hymenocallis
- Species: H. franklinensis

Binomial name
- Hymenocallis franklinensis G.L. Smith, L. C. Anderson & W.S. Flory

Species of flowering plant

Hymenocallis franklinensis (Franklin spiderlily or cow creek spiderlily) is a bulb-forming herb in the family Amaryllidaceae. It is endemic to the lower Ochlockonee River system of the Florida panhandle. It is similar to H. crassifolia Herb. but with larger flowers and broader scape bases.
