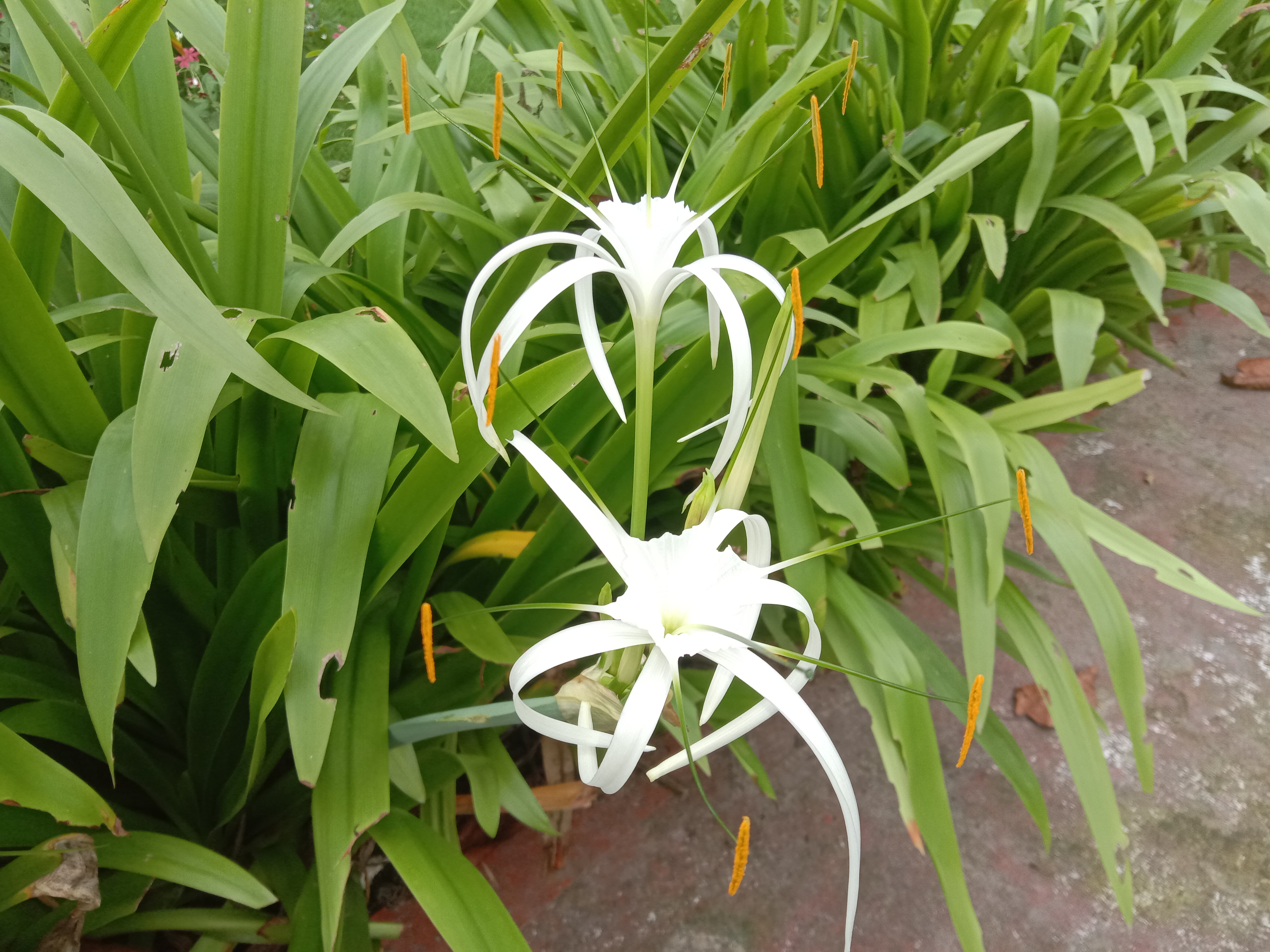

Scientific classification
- Kingdom: Plantae
- Clade: Embryophytes
- Clade: Tracheophytes
- Clade: Angiosperms
- Clade: Monocots
- Order: Asparagales
- Family: Amaryllidaceae
- Subfamily: Amaryllidoideae
- Genus: Hymenocallis
- Species: H. littoralis

Binomial name
- Hymenocallis littoralis (Jacq.) Salisb.

Synonyms
- List: Pancratium littoraleJacq.; Troxistemon littorale (Jacq.) Raf.; Hymenocallis adnata var. dryandri (Ker Gawl.) Kunth; Hymenocallis adnata var. staplesiana Herb.; Hymenocallis americana fo. staplesiana (Herb.) Voss; Hymenocallis arenaria Herb.; Hymenocallis dryandri (Ker Gawl.) Sweet; Hymenocallis insignis Kunth; Hymenocallis littoralis var. disticha (J. Sim) Herb.; Hymenocallis littoralis var. dryandri (Ker Gawl.) Herb.; Hymenocallis littoralis var. longituba Herb.; Hymenocallis panamensis Lindl.; Hymenocallis pedalis Herb.; Hymenocallis staplesiana (Herb.) M. Roem.; Hymenocallis tenuiflora Herb.; Pancratium americanum Mill.; Pancratium distichum J. Sim; Pancratium dryandri Ker Gawl.; Pancratium littorale var. dryandri (Ker Gawl.) Schult.

= Hymenocallis littoralis =

Beach spider lily

Species of flowering plant

Hymenocallis littoralis, commonly known as the beach spider lily or lirio de playa, is a species of plant in the amaryllis family Amaryllidaceae. It is native to warmer coastal regions of Latin America and a widely cultivated and naturalized plant in many tropical countries.

== Etymology ==
Hymenocallis is derived from Greek and means 'membraned beauty', a reference to its filament cup.

Littoralis means 'growing by the seashore'.

== Description ==
Hymenocallis littoralis is a bulbous perennial herb. It ranges in height from 60–70 cm (24–28 in). The bulb is 7–10 cm (2.8–3.9 in) diameter. With age, the bulb develops a neck that reaches 4–5 cm (1.6–2.0 in) diameter. The flowers are large, white, vanilla scented, and sessile. The tepals are adnate (attached to) the staminal cup. Each flower tube is 14–17 cm (5.5–6.7 in) long or longer. Perhaps its most curious feature is that its seeds are succulent, being up to ninety percent water by weight.

== Distribution ==
Hymenocallis littoralis is regarded as native to Belize, Brazil, Colombia, Costa Rica, Honduras, Mexico, Nicaragua, Panama, Peru and Venezuela. It is considered naturalized in Angola, the Bismarck Archipelago, Cameroon, Cape Verde, the Caroline Islands, the Central African Republic, the Chagos Archipelago, Ecuador, Equatorial Guinea, Fiji, French Guiana, The Gambia, the Gilbert Islands, Guinea, Guinea-Bissau, the Gulf of Guinea Islands, Hawaii, India, Java, the Line Islands, Marianas, Marquesas, the Marshall Islands, Mauritius, Nauru, Nigeria, Niue, Ogasawara-shoto, the Philippines, Samoa, the Seychelles, the Society Islands, Sri Lanka, Suriname, Tonga, Wake Island, Malaysia, Zaire and Zambia.

== Horticulture ==
Hymenocallis littoralis is often grown as an ornamental. It requires sunlight to partial shade for proper growth and blooms from mid-summer to late autumn with white flowers. It may be grown aquatically.

Hymenocallis littoralis is included in the Tasmanian Fire Service's list of low flammability plants, indicating that it is suitable for growing within a building protection zone.

== Ethnopharmacology ==
Hymenocallis littoralis has been utilized for its medicinal value. The leaf and bulb extract contain anti-viral and anti-neoplastic properties, making it a traditional medicine for wound healing.
