= Hymenocallis durangoensis =

Scientific classification
- Kingdom: Plantae
- Clade: Tracheophytes
- Clade: Angiosperms
- Clade: Monocots
- Order: Asparagales
- Family: Amaryllidaceae
- Subfamily: Amaryllidoideae
- Genus: Hymenocallis
- Species: H. durangoensis

Binomial name
- Hymenocallis durangoensis Howard

Species of flowering plant

Hymenocallis durangoensis is a plant species endemic to the Mexican state of Durango. It is a bulb-forming herb with white flowers.
