= Hymenocallis godfreyi =

Scientific classification
- Kingdom: Plantae
- Clade: Tracheophytes
- Clade: Angiosperms
- Clade: Monocots
- Order: Asparagales
- Family: Amaryllidaceae
- Subfamily: Amaryllidoideae
- Genus: Hymenocallis
- Species: H. godfreyi

Binomial name
- Hymenocallis godfreyi Smith & Darst

Species of flowering plant

Hymenocallis godfreyi (Godfrey's spiderlily or St. Mark's marsh spiderlily) is a plant in the Amaryllidaceae.

The plant is a rare endemic known only from marshes near Fort San Marcos de Apalache on the St. Mark's River in Wakulla County, Florida. Some of its range lies inside St. Marks National Wildlife Refuge.

It is a bulb-forming perennial which spreads by means of underground rhizomes. It has narrow, yellowish-green leaves; broadly funnel-shaped staminal corona, with irregular edges. Each plant produces only two flowers, one opening slightly earlier than the other, each one white with a green eye.
