= Hymenocallis pygmaea =

Dwarf spider-lily

Scientific classification
- Kingdom: Plantae
- Clade: Tracheophytes
- Clade: Angiosperms
- Clade: Monocots
- Order: Asparagales
- Family: Amaryllidaceae
- Subfamily: Amaryllidoideae
- Genus: Hymenocallis
- Species: H. pygmaea

Binomial name
- Hymenocallis pygmaea Traub

Species of flowering plant

Hymenocallis pygmaea Traub is a plant in the Amaryllidaceae found in the wild only in North Carolina and South Carolina. Common names include dwarf spider-lily and Waccamaw spider-lily, and it is cultivated as an ornamental in some regions.

Hymenocallis pygmaea is a bulb-forming herb found in bogs and along stream banks It is considerably smaller than most other species of Hymenocallis, with a scape rarely more the 40 cm tall. Leaves are up to 40 cm long but rarely more than 30 mm wide. The umbel contains only 1 or 2 flowers, white with a green center and a lemony scent.
