= Hymenocallis duvalensis =

Scientific classification
- Kingdom: Plantae
- Clade: Tracheophytes
- Clade: Angiosperms
- Clade: Monocots
- Order: Asparagales
- Family: Amaryllidaceae
- Subfamily: Amaryllidoideae
- Genus: Hymenocallis
- Species: H. duvalensis

Binomial name
- Hymenocallis duvalensis Traub ex Laferr.

Species of flowering plant

Hymenocallis duvalensis (Dixie spiderlily) is a plant species in the genus Hymenocallis, family Amaryllidaceae. It is a bulb-forming herb with showy white flowers, native to floodplains and streambanks in Florida and Georgia.

== Taxonomy ==
The species was first named in 1967 by Hamilton Paul Traub. The name was invalid according to Article 8.1 of the then International Code of Botanical Nomenclature, since Traub listed two specimens as the holotype. The name was validated by Joseph E. Laferrière in 1996.
