= Hymenocallis baumlii =

Scientific classification
- Kingdom: Plantae
- Clade: Tracheophytes
- Clade: Angiosperms
- Clade: Monocots
- Order: Asparagales
- Family: Amaryllidaceae
- Subfamily: Amaryllidoideae
- Genus: Hymenocallis
- Species: H. baumlii

Binomial name
- Hymenocallis baumlii Ravenna

Species of flowering plant

Hymenocallis baumlii is a species of spider lily named in honor of botanist James Bauml. It is a bulb-forming perennial herb with showy white flowers. The species is known from the Mexican states of Chiapas, Tabasco, Quintana Roo, Yucatán and Campeche.
