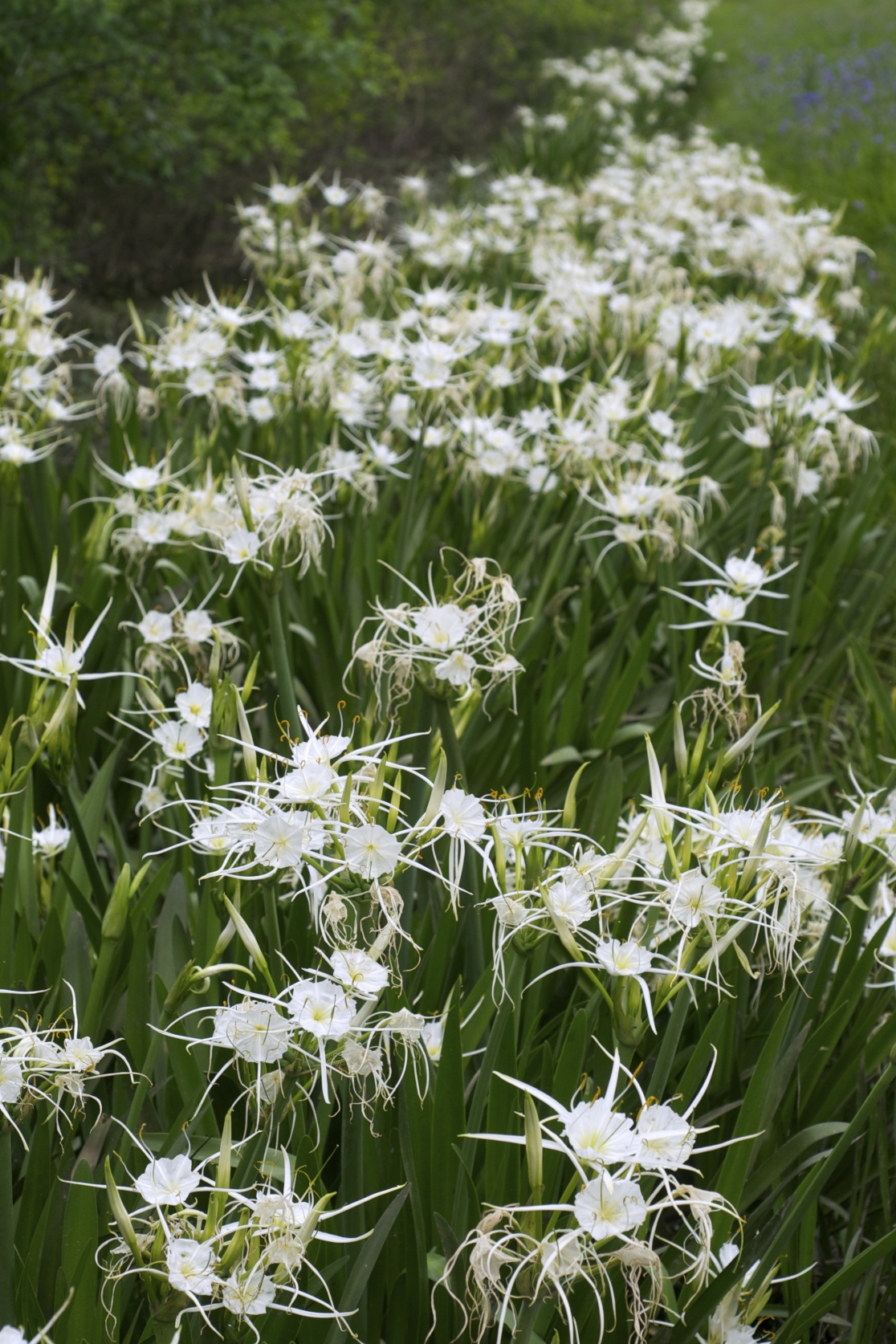

Scientific classification
- Kingdom: Plantae
- Clade: Tracheophytes
- Clade: Angiosperms
- Clade: Monocots
- Order: Asparagales
- Family: Amaryllidaceae
- Subfamily: Amaryllidoideae
- Genus: Hymenocallis
- Species: H. liriosme

Binomial name
- Hymenocallis liriosme (Raf.) Shinners 1951

Synonyms
- Pancratium liriosme Raf. 1817; Choretis galvestonensis Herb.; Hymenocallis galvestonensis (Herbert) Baker; Hymenocallis galvestonensis subsp. angustifolia Traub

= Hymenocallis liriosme =

Species of flowering plant

Hymenocallis liriosme is a North American bulb-forming herb native to Texas, Louisiana, Oklahoma, Arkansas, Mississippi and Alabama.

Hymenocallis liriosme grows in ditches and along the edges of marshes, swamps and ponds. Common names include Texas spider-lily, western marsh spider-lily, Louisiana marsh spider-lily and spring spiderlily. It is distinguished by a prominent yellow-green eye in the center of the corona.

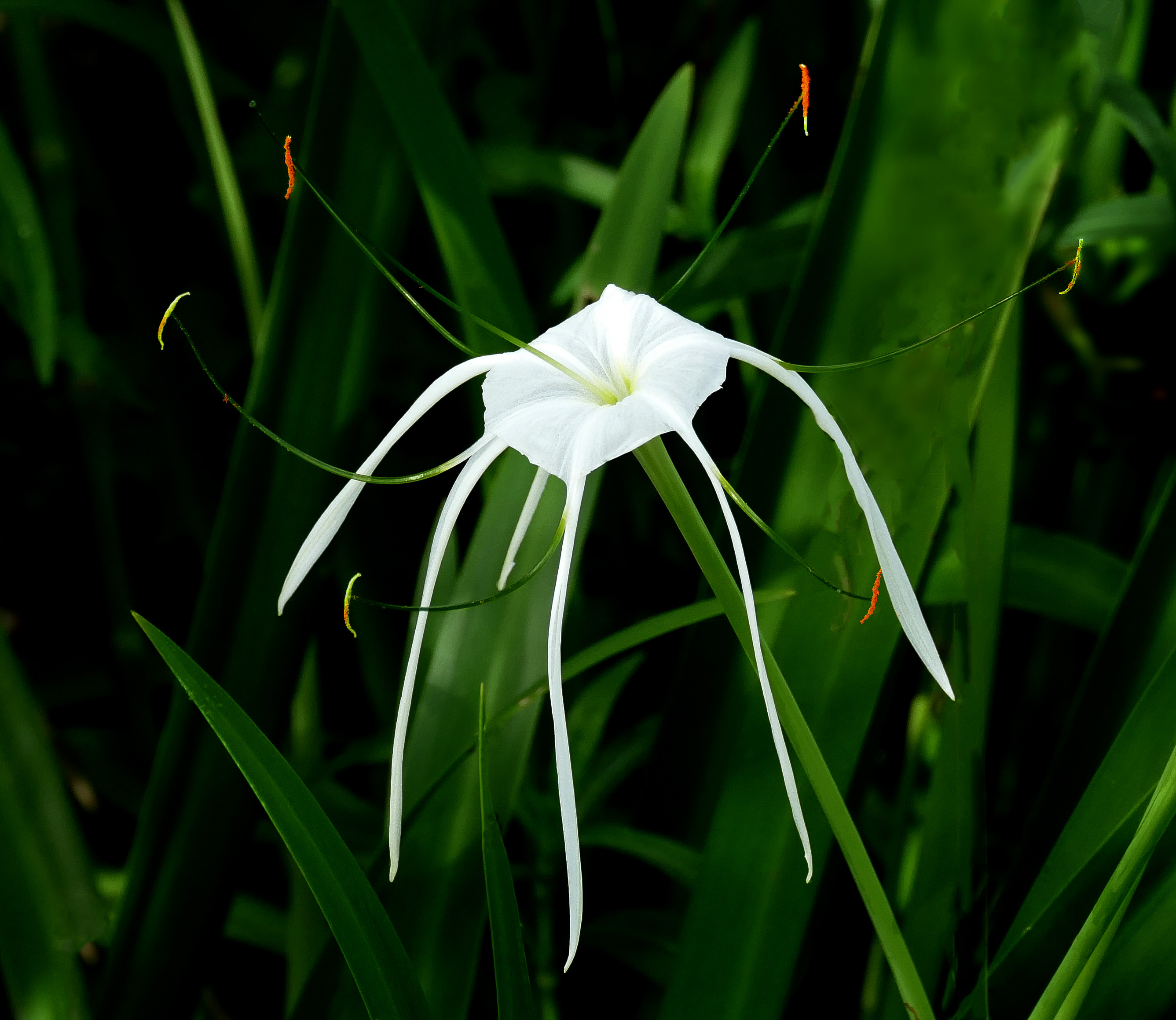
Texas spiderlily – Hymenocallis liriosme
