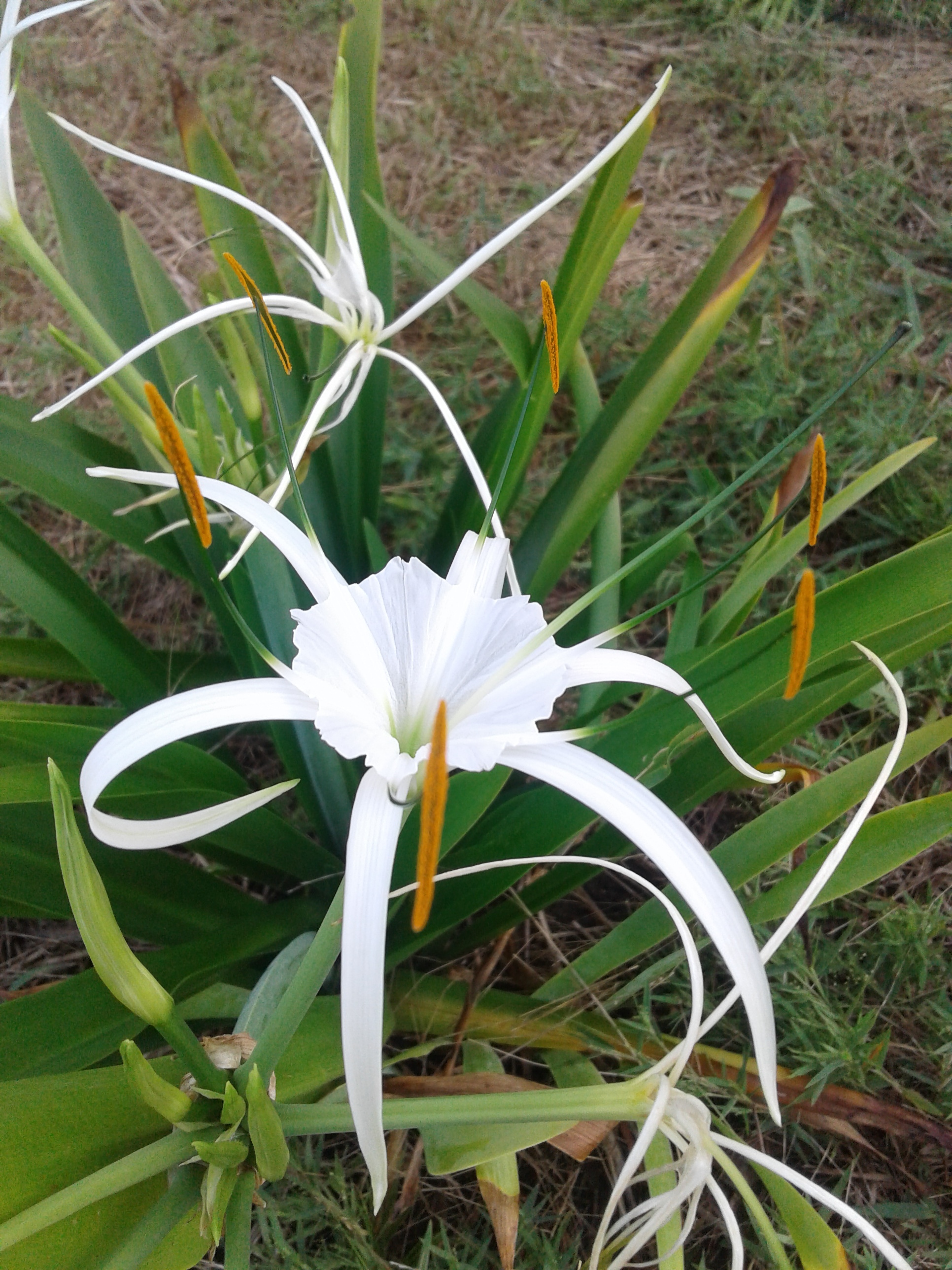

Scientific classification
- Kingdom: Plantae
- Clade: Tracheophytes
- Clade: Angiosperms
- Clade: Monocots
- Order: Asparagales
- Family: Amaryllidaceae
- Subfamily: Amaryllidoideae
- Genus: Hymenocallis
- Species: H. choctawensis

Binomial name
- Hymenocallis choctawensis Traub

= Hymenocallis choctawensis =

== Introduction ==
Hymenocallis choctawensis (H. choctawensis), commonly known as the Choctaw Spider Lily, is a member of the Amaryllis family. It grows in swamps, floodplains, and riverbanks along the Florida panhandle and in southern Georgia, Alabama, Mississippi, and Louisiana. H. choctawensis is a perennial flower that blooms in late spring to early summer, and is in danger of extinction due to rarity. It is commonly mistaken for the Carolina Spider Lily (H. caroliniana) or the Woodland Spider Lily (H. occidentalis), but H. choctawensis can be differentiated from them by chromosome number, flowering time, or by its rhizomatous bulb and triangular bracts. Key features of H. choctawensis include these rhizomatous bulbs and triangular bracts, as well as golden pollen, large oblanceolate leaves, and long white perianth segments.

== Species Description ==
For additional information about this specimen, please contact The John D. Freeman Herbarium at Auburn University.

For additional information about this specimen, please contact The John D. Freeman Herbarium at Auburn University.

H. choctawensis, commonly known as the Choctaw Spider Lily, is a native herbaceous perennial in the Amaryllis family (Amaryllidaceae) from a relatively small and elongated rhizomatous bulb. The dark green leaves are oblanceolate (shaped like a spearhead), coriaceous (relatively thick and tough), and shiny and smooth. They are also present during and after flowering. H. choctawensis produces two to twelve large, fragrant flowers at scapes. Additionally, six linear white sepals subtend a funnel-shaped white corona, with a small yellow-green "eye." Six long stamens are partially fused to the corona, with the corona’s margins bearing two to three distinct teeth between the filaments. The fruit is a spherical green capsule.

== Habitat and Distribution ==
H. choctawensis is originally from the southernmost counties in Alabama and typically grows near or in shallow water. Counties in which the plant is found within Alabama include Baldwin, Houston, Lee, Mobile, and Pike. Two of the counties are bordering, but the remaining three are non-adjacent. The plant is also found in southwestern Georgia, the Florida Panhandle, eastern Louisiana and into southeastern Mississippi. This plant is typically found in floodplain forests, along springs, and in swamps, as they are wetland plants. H. choctawensis is considered a dominant ground cover species, meaning it has high cover in the ground layer. The plant’s elevation is 0m, which is very low in comparison to neighboring species.

== Taxonomy ==
The species was described in 1962 by Hamilton Traub using bulbs that were found by Mary G. Henry in Walton Co., Fla. (USA). The plant is part of the family Amaryllidaceae. Some older references have this genus placed in Liliaceae. This species can be differentiated from other similar species based on their chromosome number, with H. caroliniana having a chromosome number of either 2n=52 or 2n=54 and H. choctawensis having 2n=44. Specimens of H. choctawensis are sometimes mistakenly labeled as H. occidentalis.

== Phylogeny ==
H. choctawensis is a member of Traub's (1962) Caroliniana alliance of Hymenocallis, as indicated by its oblanceolate leaves, few ovules/locule, and rhizomatous stems. This study also demonstrated that at least two separate times within the genus of Hymenocallis there has been an evolution of rhizome development. The remaining members of this group are all limited to low-lying environments; however, H. occidentalis grows in drier upland forests.

== Uses ==
H. choctawensis is used for decorative purposes. Its striking white flowers produce a fragrance that is long-lasting. This plant is also pollinator friendly, which helps attract insects to foster the local biodiversity. The large green and oblanceolate leaves are a feature that make it attractive in household areas. It grows primarily in wet, tropical regions which is why it is suitable to be grown around water banks and it also is fast-growing which makes it vital for environment preservation.

== Reproduction ==
H. choctawensis flowers in late spring to early summer, when 2-12 large flowers bloom at the tops of flowering stems. The flowers are monoecious, meaning that they contain both male and female reproductive organs. The male reproductive organ, the stamen, has two parts: the anther, the pollen-producing organ, and the filament, which holds up the anther. H. choctawensis has six long stamens, and the anthers produce golden pollen.The female reproductive organ is called the carpel, and it is composed of the stigma, the style, and the ovary. The stigma receives pollen from other individuals and is connected to the ovary via the style, which fades from green to white. H. choctawensis has ovoid ovaries with chambers called locules; each locule has 1-3 ovules which will eventually mature into elongated seeds once fertilized. The fruit of H. choctawensis is a globose green capsule which forms from the matured carpel. Over time, the plant forms a rhizomatous bulb which can be planted and grown from year to year.

== Threats and ICUN Status ==
The known population of H. choctawensis in the southeastern United States is scarce, despite being a native species. It holds the status of S1 in Alabama, meaning it is critically endangered and extremely rare, with only 5 or fewer occurrences or acres in existence. Globally, it is considered a mix between vulnerable and somewhat secure in population. The Natural Resources Conservation Service considers it a status of G3/G4, meaning it may have between 3,000 to more than 10,000 individuals. There is an inadequate amount of research on the H. choctawensis to know with certainty why it holds this threatened status. Some potential factors may include its limited habitat range, ease of misidentification, and loss of its wetland habitat.
