= Hymenocallis ornata =

Scientific classification
- Kingdom: Plantae
- Clade: Tracheophytes
- Clade: Angiosperms
- Clade: Monocots
- Order: Asparagales
- Family: Amaryllidaceae
- Subfamily: Amaryllidoideae
- Genus: Hymenocallis
- Species: H. ornata

Binomial name
- Hymenocallis ornata (C.D.Bouché) M.Roem.

Synonyms
- Pancratium ornatum C.D. Bouché; Hymenocallis skinneriana Herb.; Pancratium skinnerianum (Herb.) Standl. & Steyerm.

Species of flowering plant

Hymenocallis ornata is a bulb-forming herb native to Guatemala. It has showy white flowers and is frequently grown as an ornamental in many places.

Hymenocallis ornata is a bulb-forming perennial with flowers in an umbel.
