= Hymenocallis longibracteata =

Scientific classification
- Kingdom: Plantae
- Clade: Tracheophytes
- Clade: Angiosperms
- Clade: Monocots
- Order: Asparagales
- Family: Amaryllidaceae
- Subfamily: Amaryllidoideae
- Genus: Hymenocallis
- Species: H. longibracteata

Binomial name
- Hymenocallis longibracteata Hochr.

Species of flowering plant

Hymenocallis longibracteata Hochr. is a bulb-forming perennial native to the State of Veracruz in eastern Mexico. The plant has showy white flowers with a prominent white corona and narrow, reflexed tepals.
