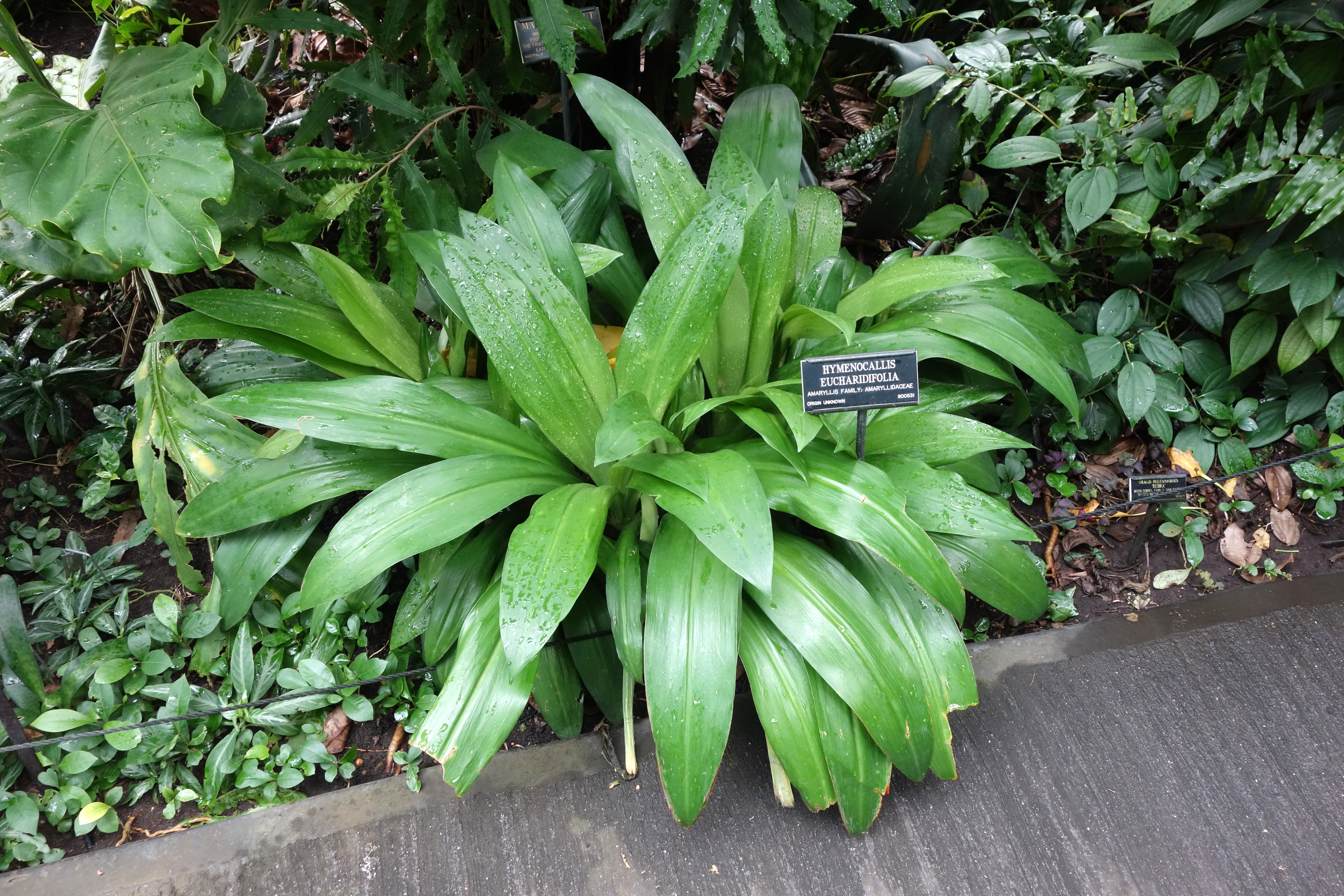

Scientific classification
- Kingdom: Plantae
- Clade: Tracheophytes
- Clade: Angiosperms
- Clade: Monocots
- Order: Asparagales
- Family: Amaryllidaceae
- Subfamily: Amaryllidoideae
- Genus: Hymenocallis
- Species: H. eucharidifolia

Binomial name
- Hymenocallis eucharidifolia Baker

= Hymenocallis eucharidifolia =

Species of flowering plant

Hymenocallis eucharidifolia is a rare plant in the plant in the Amaryllidaceae. It is native to rainforests in the Mexican states of Oaxaca and Guerrero.

Hymenocallis eucharidifolia was thought for over a century to be extinct in the wild until rediscovered a few years ago. The species is prized as an ornamental because of its showy white flowers.
