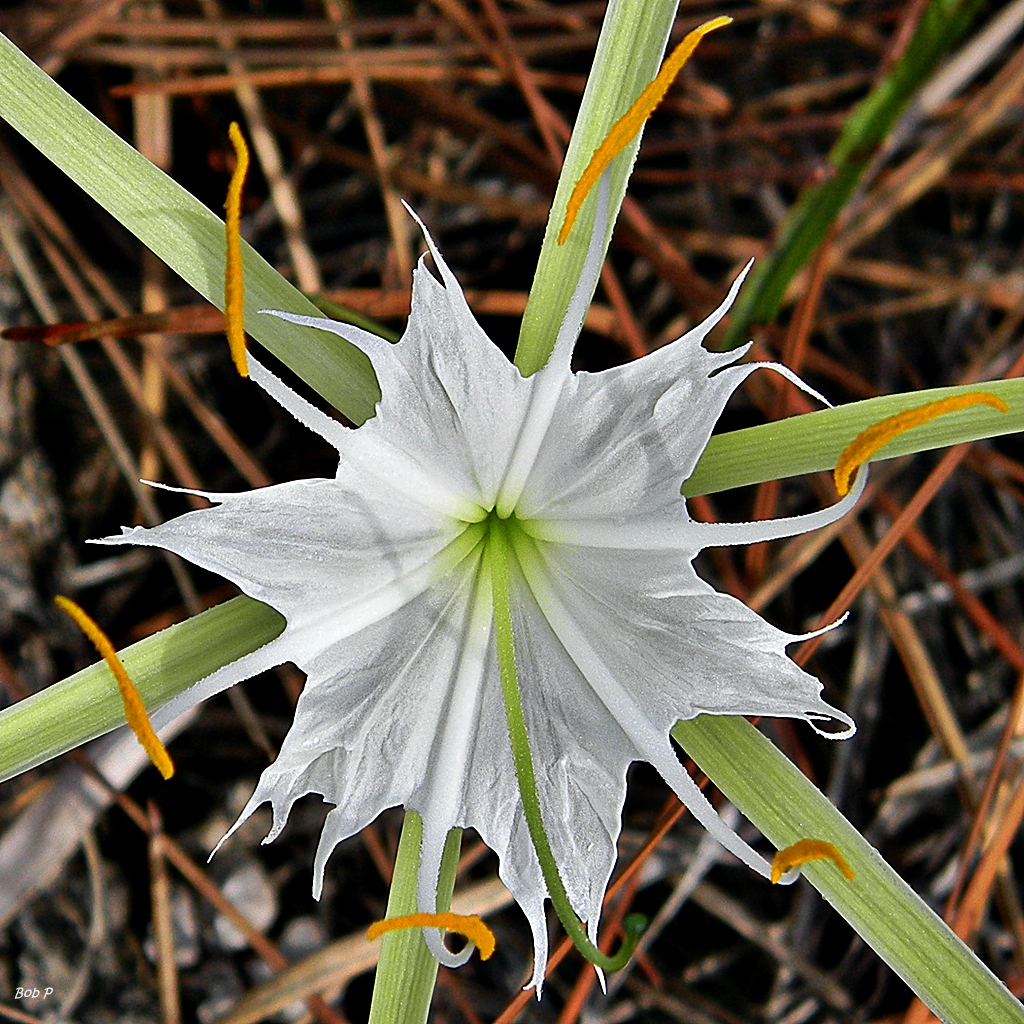

Scientific classification
- Kingdom: Plantae
- Clade: Tracheophytes
- Clade: Angiosperms
- Clade: Monocots
- Order: Asparagales
- Family: Amaryllidaceae
- Subfamily: Amaryllidoideae
- Genus: Hymenocallis
- Species: H. palmeri

Binomial name
- Hymenocallis palmeri S.Wats.

Synonyms
- Hymenocallis humilis S. Wats.

= Hymenocallis palmeri =

Species of flowering plant

Hymenocallis palmeri is a plant in the family Amaryllidaceae. Common name is alligator-lily. It is endemic to Florida, found in cypress swamps, wet meadows, open pine woodlands and wet roadsides.

Hymenocallis palmeri produces egg-shaped bulbs up to 4 cm across. Leaves are bluish green, up to 65 cm long and 10 mm across. Umbels have only 1 or 2 flowers, if 2 then opening one at a time. Flowers are erect, funnel-shaped, white with a greenish eye in the center and teeth along the margins of the staminal corona. Seeds are green, egg-shaped, up to 20 mm in diameter.
