= Hymenocallis henryae =

Green spider-lily

Scientific classification
- Kingdom: Plantae
- Clade: Tracheophytes
- Clade: Angiosperms
- Clade: Monocots
- Order: Asparagales
- Family: Amaryllidaceae
- Subfamily: Amaryllidoideae
- Genus: Hymenocallis
- Species: H. henryae

Binomial name
- Hymenocallis henryae Traub

Species of flowering plant

Hymenocallis henryae is a rare plant known only from 4 counties in northwestern Florida (Liberty, Gulf, Bay, and Walton). Common names include "green spider-lily" and "Henry’s spider-lily."

The plant is a bulb-forming herb found along cypress depressions at the edge of pine woodlands. It is distinguished from other members of the genus by its pale green tepals and its white funnel-form corona.
