= Hymenocallis venezuelensis =

Scientific classification
- Kingdom: Plantae
- Clade: Tracheophytes
- Clade: Angiosperms
- Clade: Monocots
- Order: Asparagales
- Family: Amaryllidaceae
- Subfamily: Amaryllidoideae
- Genus: Hymenocallis
- Species: H. venezuelensis

Binomial name
- Hymenocallis venezuelensis Traub

Species of plant

Hymenocallis venezuelensis is a bulb-forming herb native to Venezuela but naturalized in parts of Peru. Type location is near Guarico. Camaguan, Venezuela.

Hymenocallis venezuelensis is a small bulb-forming herb with narrow leaves and an umble of drooping white flowers. Raymúndez & Scale-Xenia discuss in some detail the morphological and anatomical differences between this and other Hymenocallis species from Venezuela.
