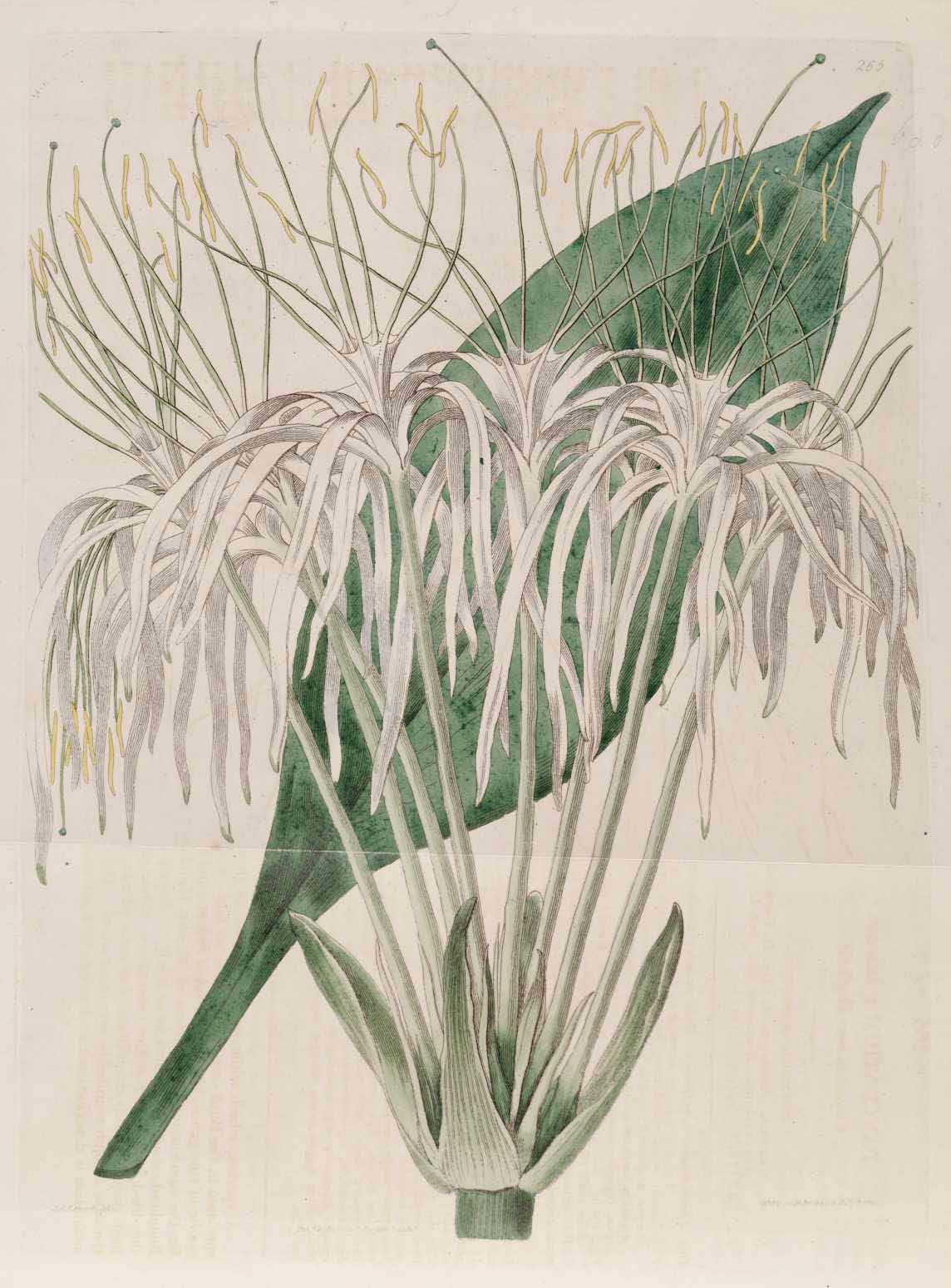
- Hymenocallis tubiflora

Scientific classification
- Kingdom: Plantae
- Clade: Tracheophytes
- Clade: Angiosperms
- Clade: Monocots
- Order: Asparagales
- Family: Amaryllidaceae
- Subfamily: Amaryllidoideae
- Genus: Hymenocallis
- Species: H. tubiflora

Binomial name
- Hymenocallis tubiflora Salisb.

Synonyms
- Hymenocallis borskiani de Vriese; Hymenocallis boschiana (Walp.) Kunth; Hymenocallis guianensis (Ker Gawl.) Herb.; Hymenocallis guianensis var. princeps Herb.; Hymenocallis guianensis var. undulata (Kunth) Herb.; Hymenocallis moritziana Kunth; Hymenocallis moritziana var. major Worsley; Hymenocallis petiolata (Willd. ex Schult. & Schult.f.) M.Roem.; Hymenocallis undulata (Kunth) Herb.; Pancratium boschianum Walp.; Pancratium guianense Ker Gawl.; Pancratium moritzianum (Kunth) Steyerm.; Pancratium petiolatum Willd. ex Schult. & Schult.f.; Pancratium triphyllum Willd. ex M.Roem.; Pancratium tubiflorum (Salisb.) Schult. & Schult.f.; Pancratium tubulosum Willd. ex B.D.Jacks.; Pancratium undulatum Kunth

= Hymenocallis tubiflora =

Species of flowering plant

Hymenocallis tubiflora is a plant species from Trinidad and northern South America. It is reported from Trinidad, Venezuela, Guyana, Suriname, French Guiana, and northern Brazil. The name was originally coined in 1812, the description based on a specimen grown at Kew Botanical Garden in London, the bulb having been seized by British sailors from a French ship captured by the Royal Navy in 1803.

Hymenocallis tubiflora is a bulb-forming perennial. It has broadly lanceolate leaves up to 60 cm long, tapering at the tip and narrowing below to a long petiole. Flowers are white, borne in an umbel; tepals long and narrow, frequently drooping at flowering time; staminal cup short. Anthers yellow, borne on long filaments.

== Gardening ==
The species is widely cultivated in tropical countries because of its attractive, fragrant floral display. It is reported naturalized in Malaysia. It can also be grown in temperate countries with proper care and protection from cold weather.
