= Hymenocallis portamonetensis =

Scientific classification
- Kingdom: Plantae
- Clade: Tracheophytes
- Clade: Angiosperms
- Clade: Monocots
- Order: Asparagales
- Family: Amaryllidaceae
- Subfamily: Amaryllidoideae
- Genus: Hymenocallis
- Species: H. portamonetensis

Binomial name
- Hymenocallis portamonetensis Ravenna

Species of flowering plant

Hymenocallis portamonetensis is a bulb-forming herb in the family Amaryllidaceae. It is native to the State of Chiapas in southern Mexico. The epithet refers to the type locale, along the Río Puerta Moneda in Chiapas.
