= Hymenocallis latifolia =

Scientific classification
- Kingdom: Plantae
- Clade: Tracheophytes
- Clade: Angiosperms
- Clade: Monocots
- Order: Asparagales
- Family: Amaryllidaceae
- Subfamily: Amaryllidoideae
- Genus: Hymenocallis
- Species: H. latifolia

Binomial name
- Hymenocallis latifolia (Mill.) Roem.

Synonyms
- Pancratium latifolium Mill.; Chrysiphiala latifolia (Mill.) Ker Gawl.; Hymenocallis caymanensis Herb.; Pancratium caymanense (Herb.) Alain; Hymenocallis collieri Small; Pancratium expansum Sims; Hymenocallis expansa (Sims) Herb.; Hymenocallis keyensis Small; Hymenocallis kimballiae Small

Species of flowering plant

Hymenocallis latifolia (mangrove spider-lily or perfumed spider-lily) is a bulb-forming perennial that grows on beaches, sand dunes, mangrove swamps and other wetlands along the coasts of Florida, Mexico, and the West Indies (Cuba, Jamaica, Puerto Rico, Cayman Islands, Bahamas, etc.). It has showy white flowers and large green seeds up to 2.5 cm in diam. Common names include "mangrove spider-lily," "perfumed spider-lily,"
