= Hymenocallis imperialis =

Big Fatty

Scientific classification
- Kingdom: Plantae
- Clade: Tracheophytes
- Clade: Angiosperms
- Clade: Monocots
- Order: Asparagales
- Family: Amaryllidaceae
- Subfamily: Amaryllidoideae
- Genus: Hymenocallis
- Species: H. imperialis

Binomial name
- Hymenocallis imperialis T.M.Howard
- Hymenocallis imperialis is endemic to Northeast Mexico

Species of flowering plant

Hymenocallis imperialis, common name Big Fatty, is a plant species native to the Mexican states of San Luis Potosí and Hidalgo. It is also cultivated in other regions as an ornamental.

== Description ==
Hymenocallis imperialis is a bulb-forming perennial producing sword-shaped leaves and an umbel of large white or yellow flowers.

== Etymology ==
The specific epithet imperialis means imperial, stately, or grand.
