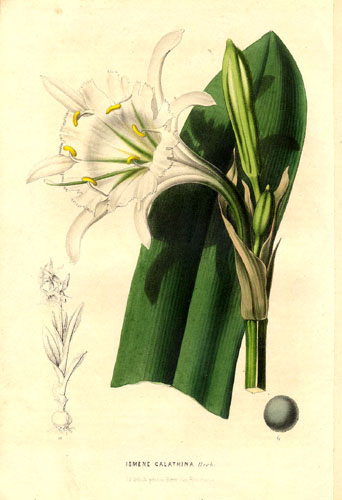
- Ismene narcissiflora

Scientific classification
- Kingdom: Plantae
- Clade: Embryophytes
- Clade: Tracheophytes
- Clade: Spermatophytes
- Clade: Angiosperms
- Clade: Monocots
- Order: Asparagales
- Family: Amaryllidaceae
- Subfamily: Amaryllidoideae
- Genus: Ismene; Salisb. ex Herb.

Type species
- Ismene amancaes (Ruiz & Pav.) Herb.

Synonyms
- Liriope Herb., nom. illeg.; Elisena Herb.; Pseudostenomesson Velarde

= Ismene (plant) =

Ismene Temporal range: 26.14 –0 Ma Late Oligocene – Recent

Genus of flowering plants

Ismene, or Peruvian daffodil, is a genus of South American plants in the Amaryllis family. The species are native to Peru and Ecuador and widely cultivated elsewhere as ornamentals because of their large, showy flowers.

Ismene produces tender perennial bulbs bearing a strong resemblance to those of Hymenocallis, a genus into which Ismene had often been grouped in the past. However, its morphology differs from Hymenocallis in several significant ways: its vegetative parts, natural range, and chromosome number are all distinct.

== Taxonomy ==
The genus Ismene Salisb. ex Herb. was validly described in 1821 by William Herbert with Ismene amancaes (Ruiz & Pav.) Herb. as the type species based on previous work by Richard Anthony Salisbury.

=== Species ===
A list of Ismene species and their geographic distribution is given below.

- Ismene amancaes (Ruiz & Pav.) Herb – western Peru
- Ismene hawkesii (Vargas) Gereau & Meerow – Cusco, Peru
- Ismene longipetala (Lindl.) Meerow – southwestern Ecuador, northwestern Peru
- Ismene morrisonii (Vargas) Gereau & Meerow – Apurímac, Peru
- Ismene narcissiflora (Jacq.) M.Roem. – south-central Peru
- Ismene nutans (Ker Gawl.) Herb. – Peru
- Ismene pedunculata Herb. – Peru
- Ismene ringens (Ruiz & Pav.) Gereau & Meerow – Peru
- Ismene sublimis (Herb.) Gereau & Meerow – La Libertad, Peru
- Ismene vargasii (Velarde) Gereau & Meerow – Peru

=== Hybrids ===
- Ismene × deflexa Herb. (I. longipetala × I. narcissiflora) – Peru

== Phylogeny ==
It is closely related to Leptochiton and Hymenocallis, from which it separated 26.14 million years ago. The separation of Leptochiton and Hymenocallis occurred 24.46 million years ago.

- Hymenocallideae
  - - Hymenocallis
    - Leptochiton
  - Ismene
