= Hymenocallis multiflora =

Scientific classification
- Kingdom: Plantae
- Clade: Tracheophytes
- Clade: Angiosperms
- Clade: Monocots
- Order: Asparagales
- Family: Amaryllidaceae
- Subfamily: Amaryllidoideae
- Genus: Hymenocallis
- Species: H. multiflora

Binomial name
- Hymenocallis multiflora Vargas

Species of plant

Hymenocallis multiflora is a bulb-forming herb in the family Amaryllidaceae and native to Peru. Each individual has an umbel with several small, white flowers.
