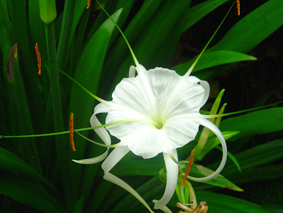

Scientific classification
- Kingdom: Plantae
- Clade: Tracheophytes
- Clade: Angiosperms
- Clade: Monocots
- Order: Asparagales
- Family: Amaryllidaceae
- Subfamily: Amaryllidoideae
- Genus: Hymenocallis
- Species: H. acutifolia

Binomial name
- Hymenocallis acutifolia (Herb.) Sweet 1830 not M. Roem. 1847

Synonyms
- Hymenocallis littoralis var. acutifolia Herb. ex Sims; Hymenocallis adnata var. acutifolia (Herb. ex Sims) Herb.; Hymenocallis americana f. acutifolia (Herb. ex Sims) Voss; Hymenocallis riparia Greenm.

= Hymenocallis acutifolia =

Species of flowering plant

Hymenocallis acutifolia is a plant species first described in 1826 with the name Hymenocallis littoralis var. acutifolia. It is endemic to Mexico, known from the States of Oaxaca, Michoacán, Jalisco, Veracruz, Puebla, and Nayarit.

== Etymology ==
The specific epithet (acutifolia) is derived from the Latin words acutus meaning "pointed" and folium meaning "leaf".
