= Hymenocallis guerreroensis =

Scientific classification
- Kingdom: Plantae
- Clade: Tracheophytes
- Clade: Angiosperms
- Clade: Monocots
- Order: Asparagales
- Family: Amaryllidaceae
- Subfamily: Amaryllidoideae
- Genus: Hymenocallis
- Species: H. guerreroensis

Binomial name
- Hymenocallis guerreroensis T.M.Howard

Species of flowering plant

Hymenocallis guerreroensis T.M.Howard is a bulb-forming herb native to the Mexican states of Guerrero and Morelos. Common name "Guerrero spider-lily." It is sometimes cultivated for its showy white flowers.
