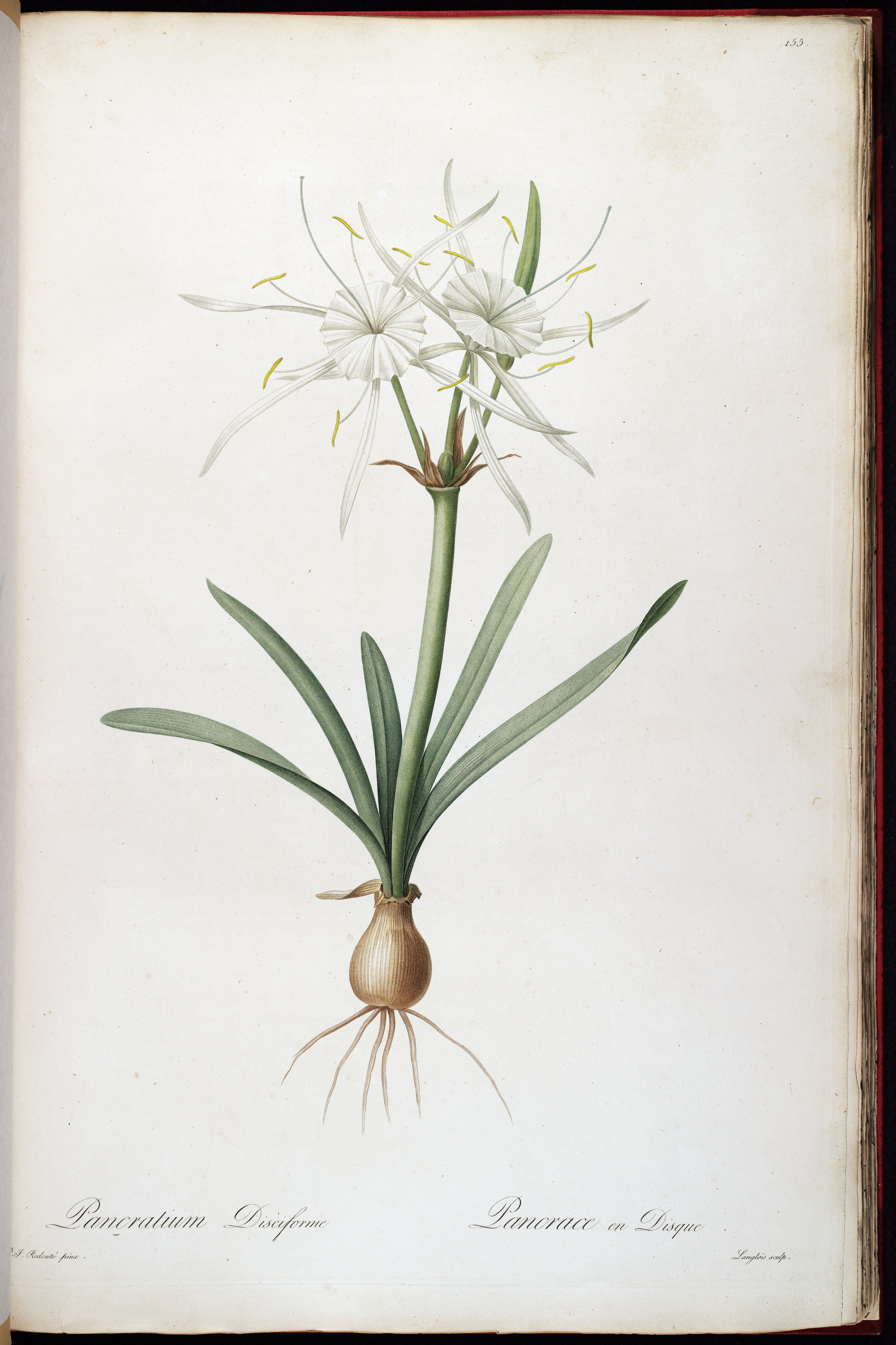
- Hymenocallis rotata

Scientific classification
- Kingdom: Plantae
- Clade: Embryophytes
- Clade: Tracheophytes
- Clade: Spermatophytes
- Clade: Angiosperms
- Clade: Monocots
- Order: Asparagales
- Family: Amaryllidaceae
- Subfamily: Amaryllidoideae
- Genus: Hymenocallis
- Species: H. rotata

Binomial name
- Hymenocallis rotata (Ker Gawler) Herb.

Synonyms
- Pancratium rotatum Ker Gawler; Hymenocallis disciformis (DC.) M.Roem.; Hymenocallis floridana (Raf.) Morton; Hymenocallis floridana subsp. amplifolia Traub; Hymenocallis lacera var. minor Chapm.; Hymenocallis laciniata Small; Hymenocallis mexicana Herb.; Hymenocallis paludosa Salisb.; Hymenocallis rotata var. disciformis (DC.) Herb.; Hymenocallis rotata var. quadrifolia Herb.; Ismene knightii Knowles & Westc.; Pancratium carribaeum Mill.; Pancratium disciforme DC.; Pancratium rotatum var. biflorum Ker Gawl.; Pancratium rotatum var. pluriflorum Ker Gawl.; Tomodon floridanum Raf.; Tomodon rotatum (Ker Gawl.) Raf.

= Hymenocallis rotata =

Species of flowering plant

Hymenocallis rotata, the streambank spiderlily or springrun spiderlily, is a plant in the family Amaryllidaceae, endemic to the north-central portions of the US state of Florida. It is found along the banks of spring-fed streams in the region.

The species is a perennial herb with rhizomatous bulbs, with showy flowers that open in late Spring and early Summer. The shape of the staminal corona is distinctive within the genus, rotate rather than the more common funnel-shaped, white with a yellow-green eye near the center.
