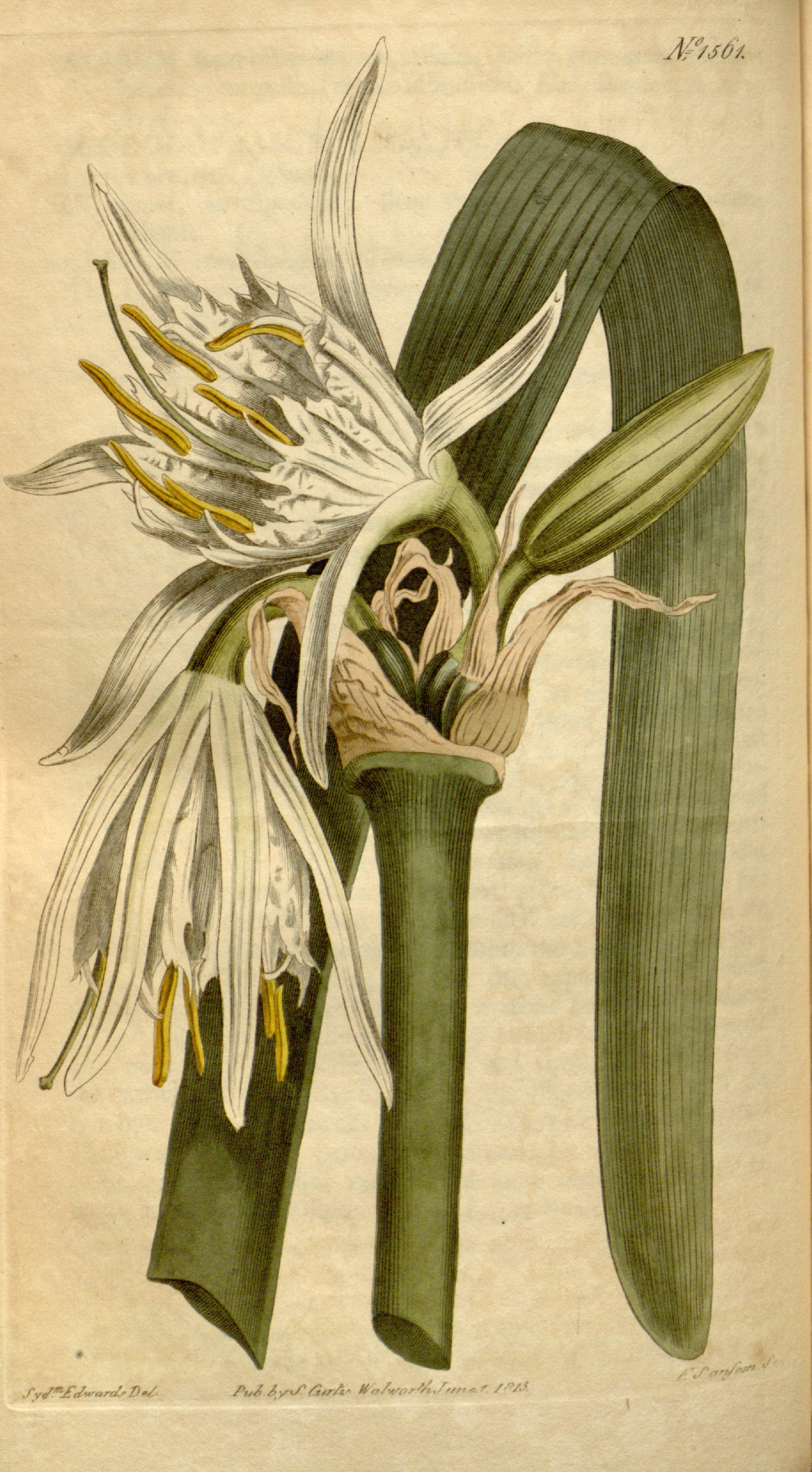
- Flowers and leaf.

Scientific classification
- Kingdom: Plantae
- Clade: Tracheophytes
- Clade: Angiosperms
- Clade: Monocots
- Order: Asparagales
- Family: Amaryllidaceae
- Subfamily: Amaryllidoideae
- Genus: Ismene
- Species: I. nutans

Binomial name
- Ismene nutans (Ker Gawl.) Herb.

Synonyms
- Hymenocallis nutans (Ker Gawl.) Baker; Pancratium fluitans Fraser ex Schult. & Schult.f.; Pancratium knightii Steud.; Pancratium nutans Ker Gawl.

= Ismene nutans =

Species of plant

Ismene nutans is a plant species in the family Amaryllidaceae. It is native to the Andes.
