= Hymenocallis crassifolia =

Scientific classification
- Kingdom: Plantae
- Clade: Tracheophytes
- Clade: Angiosperms
- Clade: Monocots
- Order: Asparagales
- Family: Amaryllidaceae
- Subfamily: Amaryllidoideae
- Genus: Hymenocallis
- Species: H. crassifolia

Binomial name
- Hymenocallis crassifolia Herb.

Synonyms
- Pancratium crassifolium (Herb.) Schult. & Schult.f.; Hymenocallis palusvirensis Traub; Tomodon pratense Raf.; Tomodon riparium Raf.

Species of flowering plant

Hymenocallis crassifolia is a flowering plant in the family Amaryllidaceae. Its common name is coastal Carolina spiderlily. It is known from wetlands in North Carolina, South Carolina, Georgia and Florida. It is distinguished from other species of the genus by its stiff, coriaceous, liguliform leaves.
