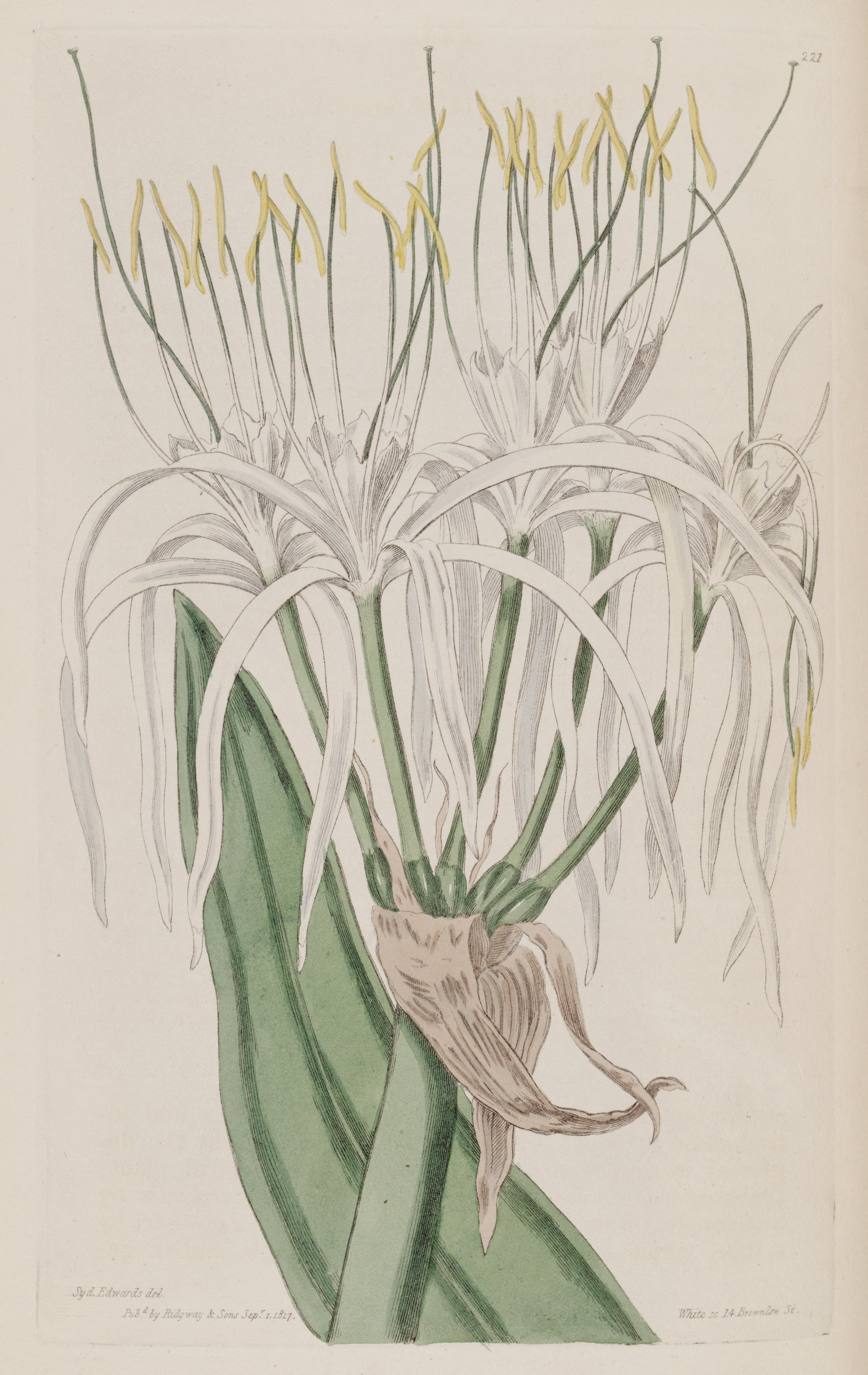
- Hymenocallis caribaea
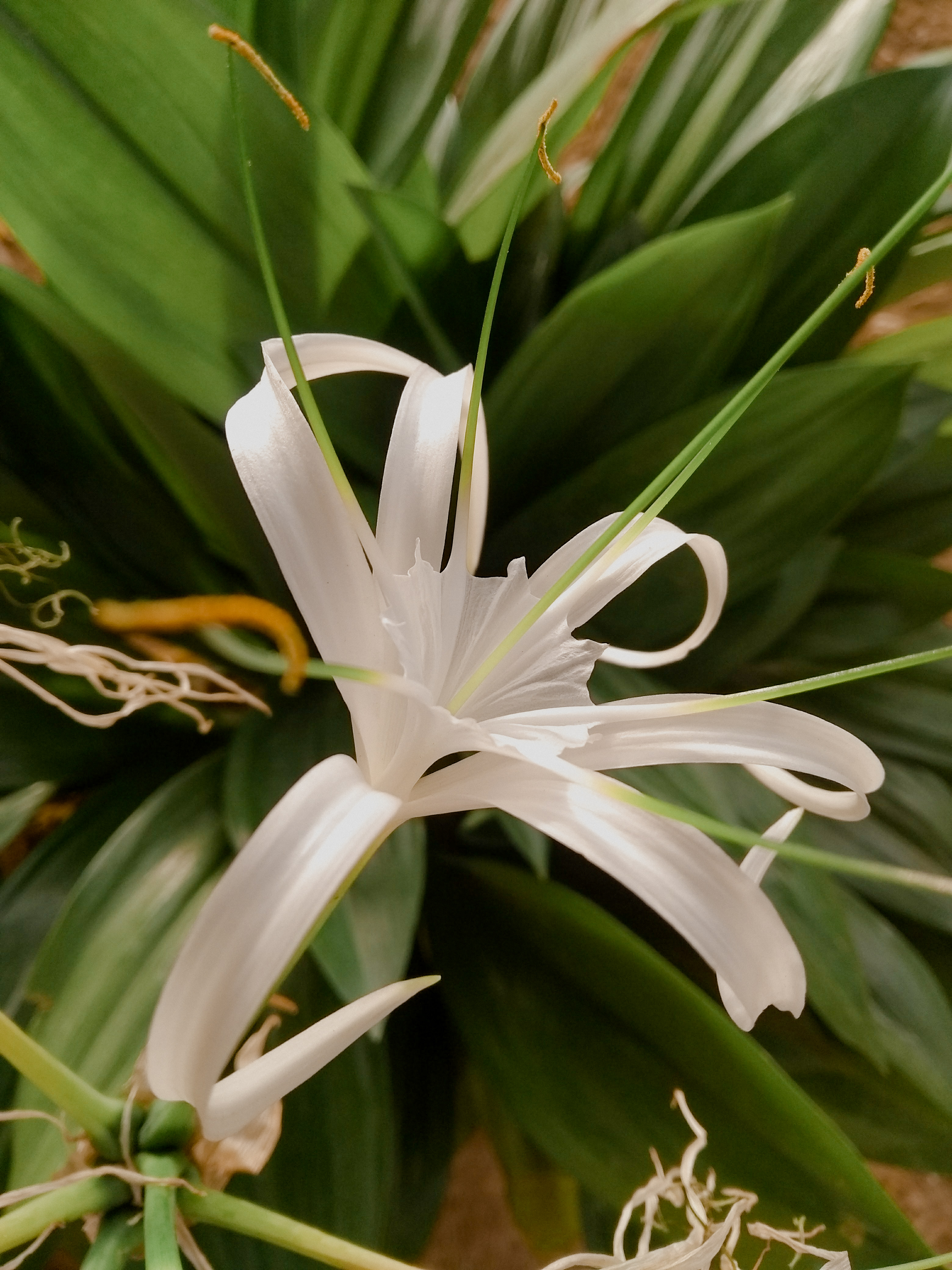

Scientific classification
- Kingdom: Plantae
- Clade: Tracheophytes
- Clade: Angiosperms
- Clade: Monocots
- Order: Asparagales
- Family: Amaryllidaceae
- Subfamily: Amaryllidoideae
- Genus: Hymenocallis
- Species: H. caribaea

Binomial name
- Hymenocallis caribaea Moraisalim

Synonyms
- Pancratium caribaeum L.; Nemepiodon caribeum (L.) Raf.; Pancratium angustum Ker Gawl.; Hymenocallis angusta (Ker-Gawl.) Herb.; Hymenocallis cinerascens M.Roem.; Pancratium declinatum Jacq.; Hymenocallis declinata (Jacq.) M. Roem.; Hymenocallis obtusata (Griseb.) Walp.; Pancratium obtusatum Griseb.; Pancratium patens Lindl. ex Delile; Hymenocallis patens (Lindl. ex Delile) Herb.; Hymenocallis caribaea var. patens (Delile) Herb.; Pancratium amoenum Salisb.; Pancratium excisum L.f. ex Kunth; Pancratium recurvum Stokes; Troxistemon fragrans Raf.

= Hymenocallis caribaea =

Caribbean spider-lily

Species of flowering plant

Hymenocallis caribaea (commonly known as the Caribbean spider-lily or variegated spider-lily) is a flowering plant in the family Amaryllidaceae. The species was first described by Linnaeus and later assigned its current name by Herbert.

It is native to the islands of the Caribbean and northern South America, including Puerto Rico, Jamaica, Hispaniola, Cuba, the Virgin Islands, the Windward and Leeward Islands, and the Venezuelan Antilles. The Caribbean spider-lily is also widely cultivated as an ornamental plant in many tropical and subtropical regions. It has reportedly become naturalized in locations such as Sri Lanka, New South Wales, New Orleans, Bermuda, French Guiana, Suriname, and Guyana.

== Description ==
Hymenocallis caribaea is a bulb-forming perennial plant known for its striking white flowers. The plant features leaves that can grow up to 80 cm long. The flower structure, known as an umbel, can contain as many as 12 flowers. Each flower has narrowly linear tepals that can reach up to 10 cm in length, usually drooping at the time of flowering.
