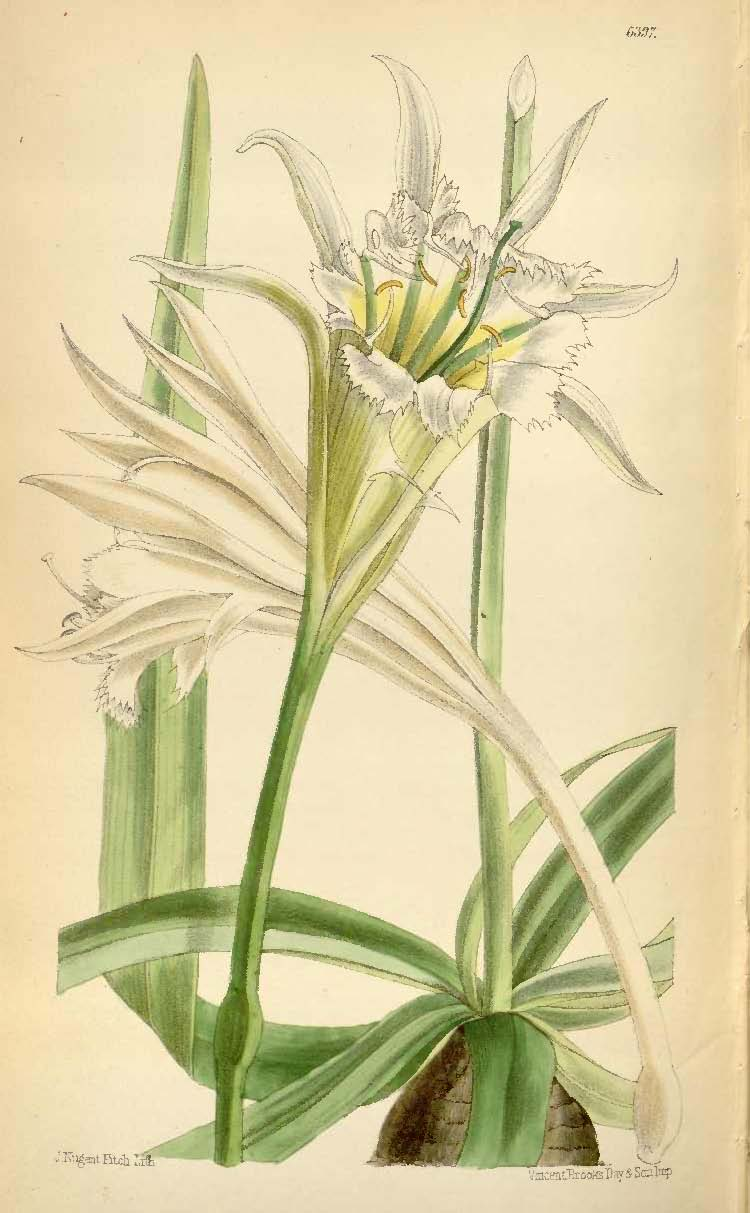
- Leptochiton quitoensis

Scientific classification
- Kingdom: Plantae
- Clade: Embryophytes
- Clade: Tracheophytes
- Clade: Spermatophytes
- Clade: Angiosperms
- Clade: Monocots
- Order: Asparagales
- Family: Amaryllidaceae
- Subfamily: Amaryllidoideae
- Tribe: Hymenocallideae
- Genus: Leptochiton; Sealy

Type species
- Leptochiton quitoensis (Herb.) Sealy
- Leptochiton is native to Ecuador and Peru

Synonyms
- Lepidochiton Meerow, orth. var.

= Leptochiton (plant) =

Leptochiton Temporal range: 24.46 –0 Ma Late Oligocene – Recent

Genus of plant

Leptochiton is a genus of South American plants in the family Amaryllidaceae native to Ecuador and Peru.

== Description ==
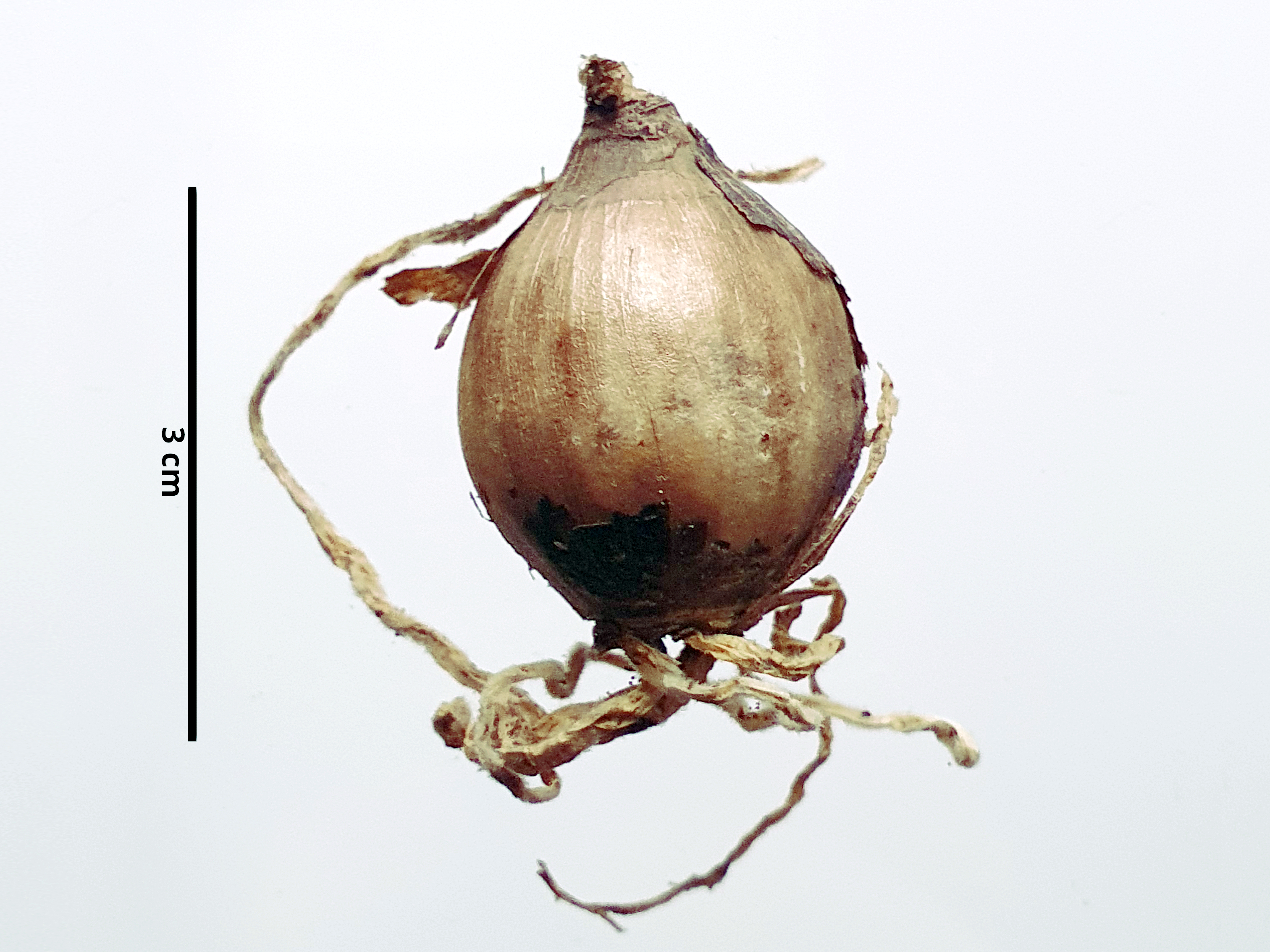
Leptochiton quitoensis (Herb.) Sealy bulb with scale bar (3 cm)

=== Generative characteristics ===
Leptochiton has phytomelanous seeds, which is unique among the tribe Hymenocallideae.

=== Cytology ===
The diploid chromosome count is 2n = 24 or 2n = 34.

== Taxonomy ==
It was published by Joseph Robert Sealy in 1937 with Leptochiton quitoensis (Herb.) Sealy as the type species. It is placed in the tribe Hymenocallideae.

=== Species ===
There are 2 known species, native to Ecuador and Peru:

- Leptochiton helianthus (Ravenna) Gereau & Meerow - Peru (Cajamarca)
- Leptochiton quitoensis (Herb.) Sealy - Ecuador (Guayas, Loja), Peru

=== Etymology ===
The generic name Leptochiton is derived from the Greek leptos meaning thin, delicate, small, or slender, and chiton meaning covering or tunic. It refers to the thin testa.

== Phylogeny ==
It is closely related to Ismene, to which it shared a common ancestor 26.14 million years ago. It is the sister group to Hymenocallis, from which it separated 24.46 million years ago.

- Hymenocallideae
  - - Hymenocallis
    - Leptochiton
  - Ismene
