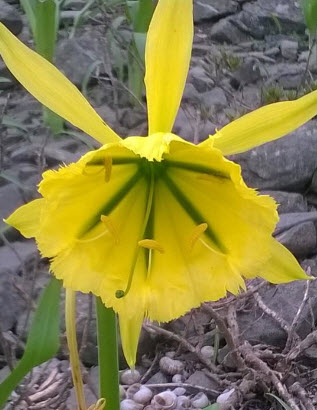
- Flower close-up.

Scientific classification
- Kingdom: Plantae
- Clade: Tracheophytes
- Clade: Angiosperms
- Clade: Monocots
- Order: Asparagales
- Family: Amaryllidaceae
- Subfamily: Amaryllidoideae
- Genus: Ismene
- Species: I. amancaes

Binomial name
- Ismene amancaes (Ruiz & Pav.) Herb.
- Ismene amancaes is endemic to Peru

Synonyms
- Hymenocallis amancaes (Ruiz & Pav.) G.Nicholson; Narcissus amancaes Ruiz & Pav.; Pancratium amancaes (Ruiz & Pav.) Ker Gawl.; Hymenocallis amancaes subsp. herbertiana Traub; Ismene crinifolia Salisb.; Ismene integra M.Roem.

= Ismene amancaes =

Species of plant

Ismene amancaes, commonly called amancae or amancay, is a herbaceous plant species in the family Amaryllidaceae and native to the coastal hills of Peru.

== Description ==
I. amancaes is a species with spherical bulbs 3.5–5 cm in diameter. The leaves are strap-shaped, 25–50 cm long and 2.5–5 cm wide, bright green. The 2–6 yellow pedicellate flowers are borne at the end of a scape up to 33 cm long. The floral tube is greenish yellow, 5–7.5 cm long, bearing at the end the tepals, which are linear to narrowly lanceolate, 6–7.5 cm long, with green tips. The floral corona is funnel-shaped, yellow with green stripes, 5–6 cm long, 6–8.5 cm wide, bearing the stamens facing inwards.

== Distribution and habitat ==
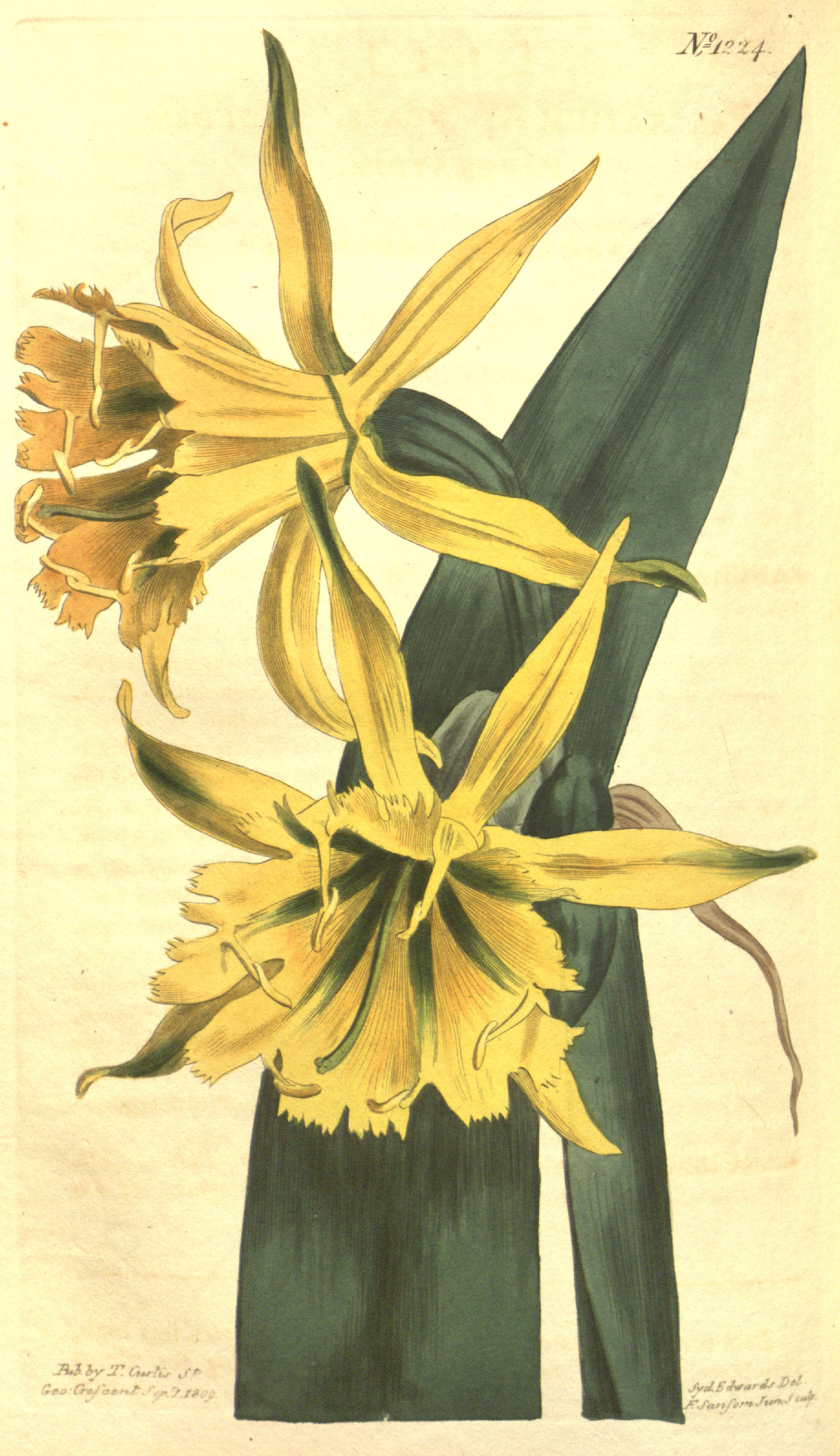
Flowers and part of a leaf.

Endemic to Peru, Ismene amancaes inhabits coastal hills up to 1500 m of elevation, especially near the city of Lima, as part of the lomas ecosystem.

== Chemical compounds ==
It is reported that I. amancaes contains the alkaloids galantamine and narcissidine.

== History ==
Remains of I. amancaes have been found in archaeological sites near the city of Lima.

The flowering of this species was the subject of a festival ("Festival de Amancaise") celebrated in June in Lima, until the first half of the 1800s. In a place among the hills surrounding Lima, people from the city gathered annually to celebrate the flowering of the plant in a festival with music and dance, similar to May Day. The festival attracted people from all classes of the society then, while a common sight was people sporting the flowers in their garments.

== Conservation ==
I. amancaes is considered an endangered species by the IUCN since 1997.
