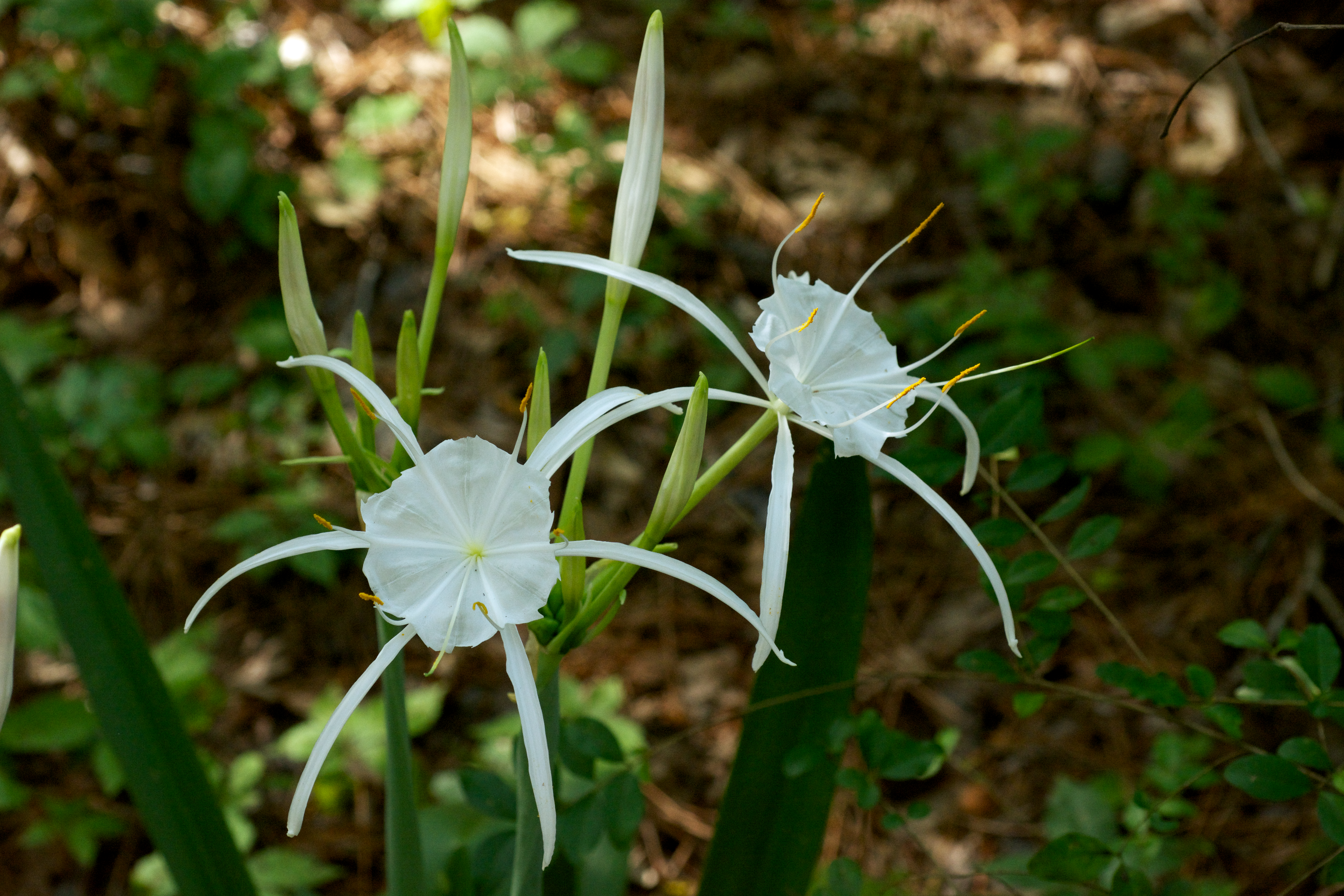

Scientific classification
- Kingdom: Plantae
- Clade: Tracheophytes
- Clade: Angiosperms
- Clade: Monocots
- Order: Asparagales
- Family: Amaryllidaceae
- Subfamily: Amaryllidoideae
- Genus: Hymenocallis
- Species: H. occidentalis

Binomial name
- Hymenocallis occidentalis (J.LeConte) Kunth

Synonyms
- Hymenocallis bidentata Small; Hymenocallis moldenkeana Traub; Pancratium occidentale J. Le Conte

= Hymenocallis occidentalis =

Woodland spider-lily

Species of flowering plant

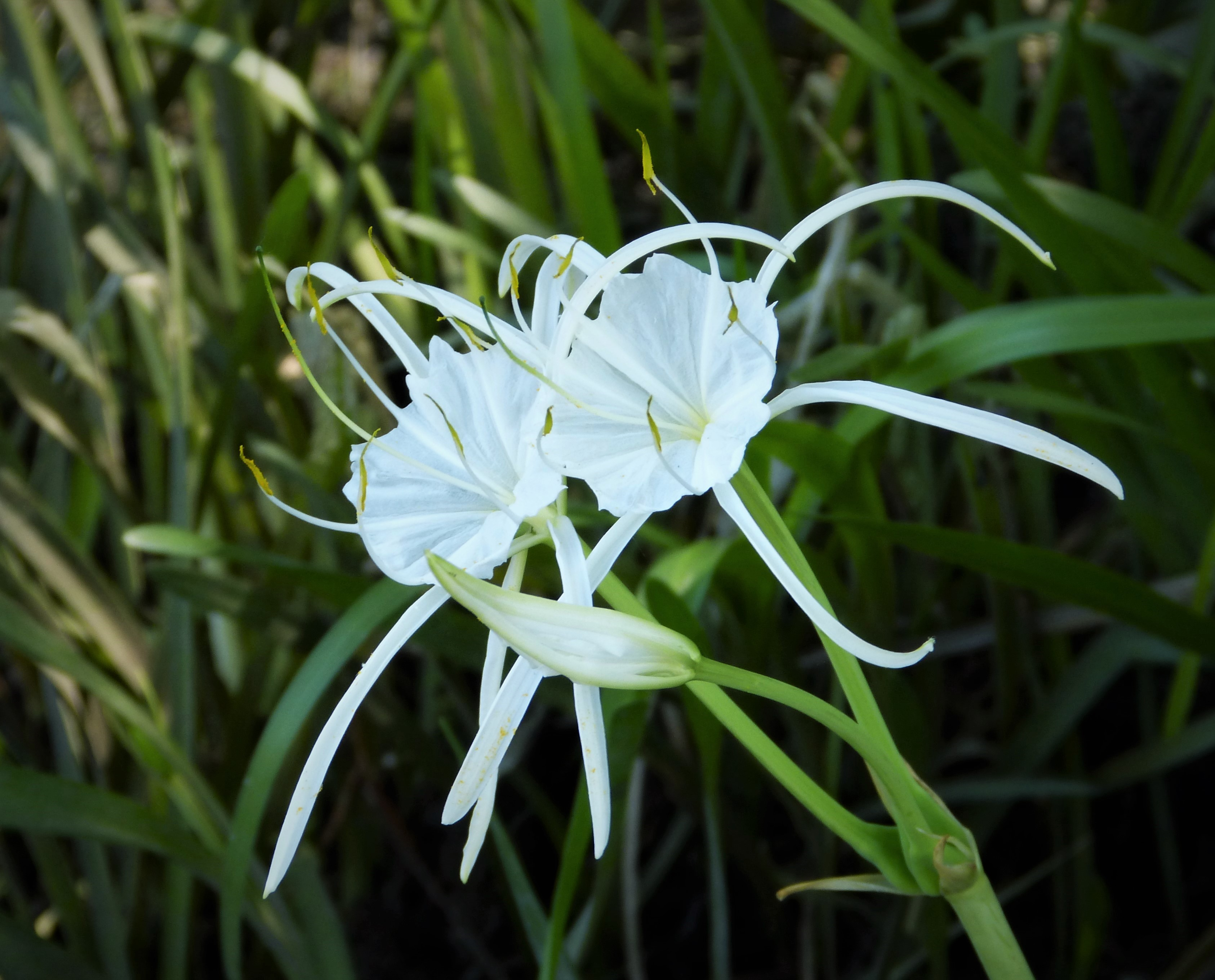
In the Okefenokee Swamp

Hymenocallis occidentalis is a plant species native to the southern United States. It is known along the Gulf Coast from South Carolina to Texas, and in the Mississippi Valley as far north as southern Illinois and Indiana. It is also cultivated as an ornamental elsewhere because of its showy, sweet-smelling flowers. Common names include woodland spider-lily, hammock spider-lily or northern spider-lily.

Many of the other U.S. species of the genus grow in wetlands and along streambanks, but H. occidentalis can often be found in mesic forests. Some of the Mexican species (e. g. H. clivorum and H. pimana) can similarly be found some distance from waterways.

Hymenocallis occidentalis is a bulb-forming perennial herb bearing an umbel of 3-9 showy flowers, each white with a green center, opening one at a time. Leaves are lanceolate, up to 60 cm long and 6 cm wide at their widest points.

The name Hymenocallis caroliniana has been frequently misapplied to this species but is properly a synonym of Pancratium maritimum.

== Varieties ==
As of May 2021, Plants of the World Online accepted two varieties:

- Hymenocallis occidentalis var. eulae (Shinners) Ger.L.Sm. & Flory – native to Oklahoma and Texas
- Hymenocallis occidentalis var. occidentalis – native to Alabama, Arkansas, Florida, Georgia, Illinois, Indiana, Kentucky, Louisiana, Mississippi, Missouri, North Carolina, South Carolina and Tennessee
