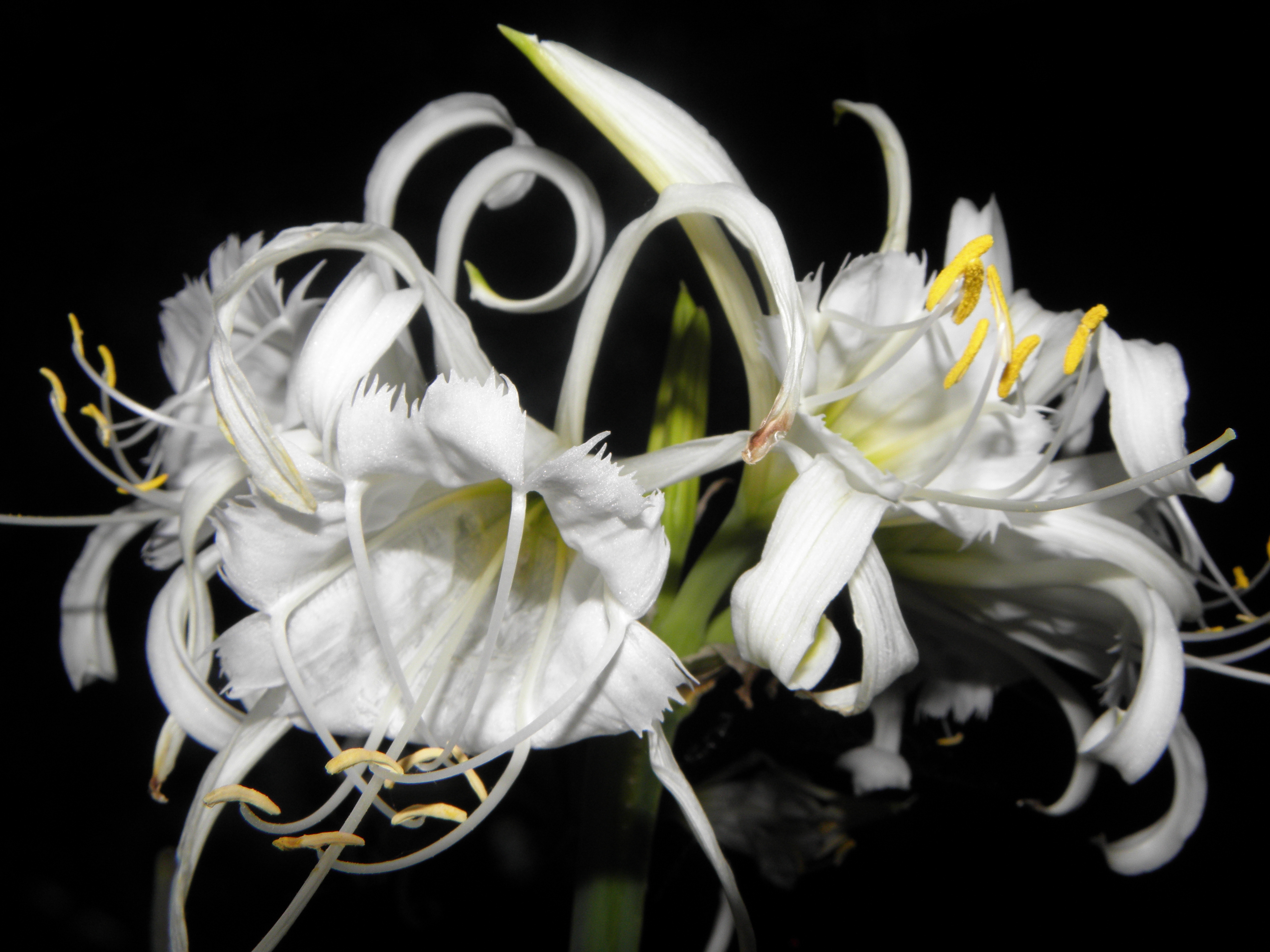
- Flowers close-up.

Scientific classification
- Kingdom: Plantae
- Clade: Tracheophytes
- Clade: Angiosperms
- Clade: Monocots
- Order: Asparagales
- Family: Amaryllidaceae
- Subfamily: Amaryllidoideae
- Genus: Ismene
- Species: I. narcissiflora

Binomial name
- Ismene narcissiflora (Jacq.) M.Roem.

Synonyms
- Hymenocallis calathina (Herb.) G.Nicholson; Hymenocallis narcissiflora (Jacq.) J.F.Macbr.; Ismene calathiformis (F.Delaroche) M.Roem.; Ismene calathina Herb.; Ismene tagliabuei M.Roem.; Pancratium calathiforme F.Delaroche; Pancratium calathinum Ker Gawl.; Pancratium narcissiflorum Jacq.; Siphotoma calathina (Herb.) Raf.

= Ismene narcissiflora =

Species of plant

Ismene narcissiflora is a plant species in the family Amaryllidaceae. It is native to Peru and Bolivia.

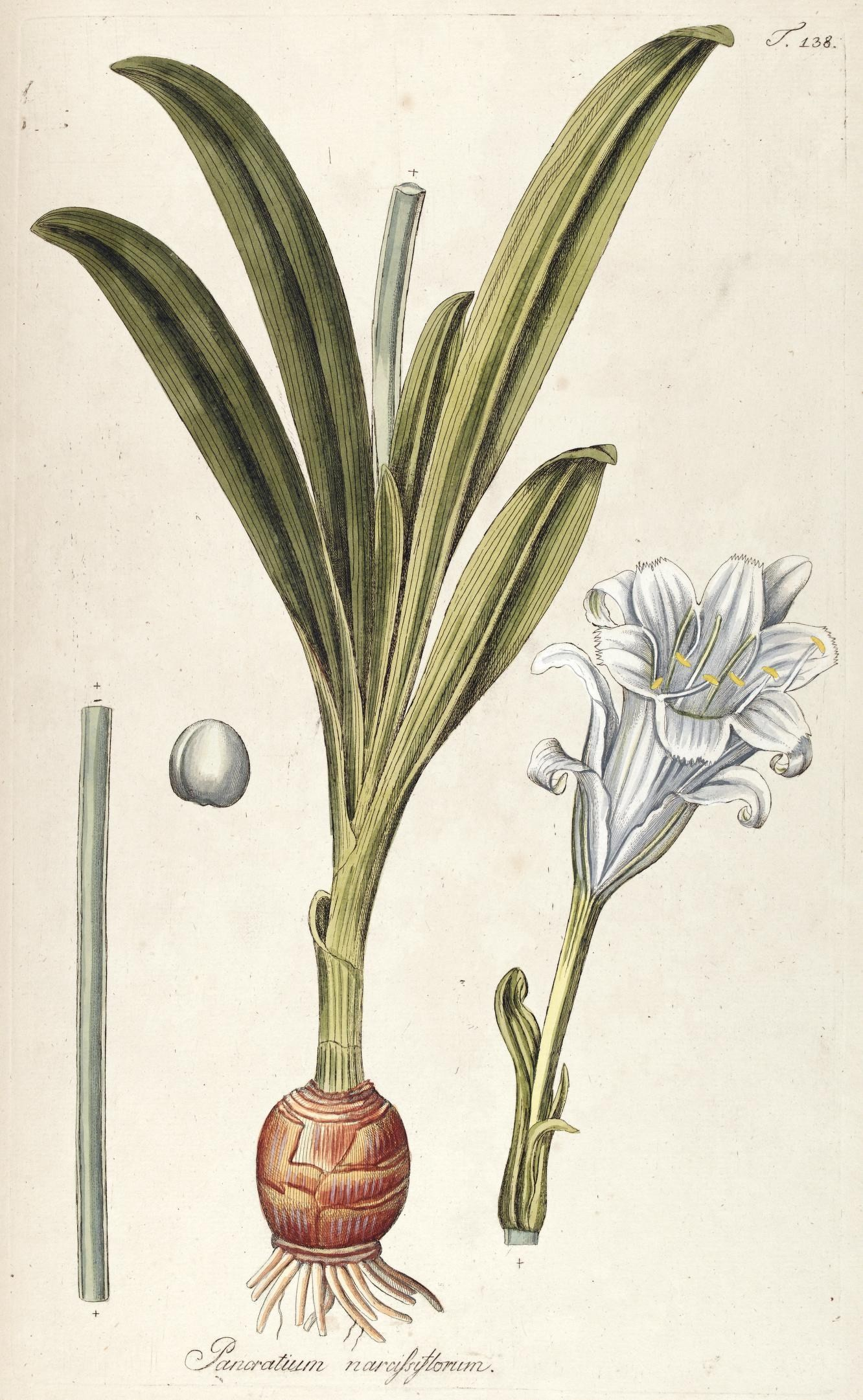
T. 138 Fragmenta botanica, figuris coloratis illustrata.
