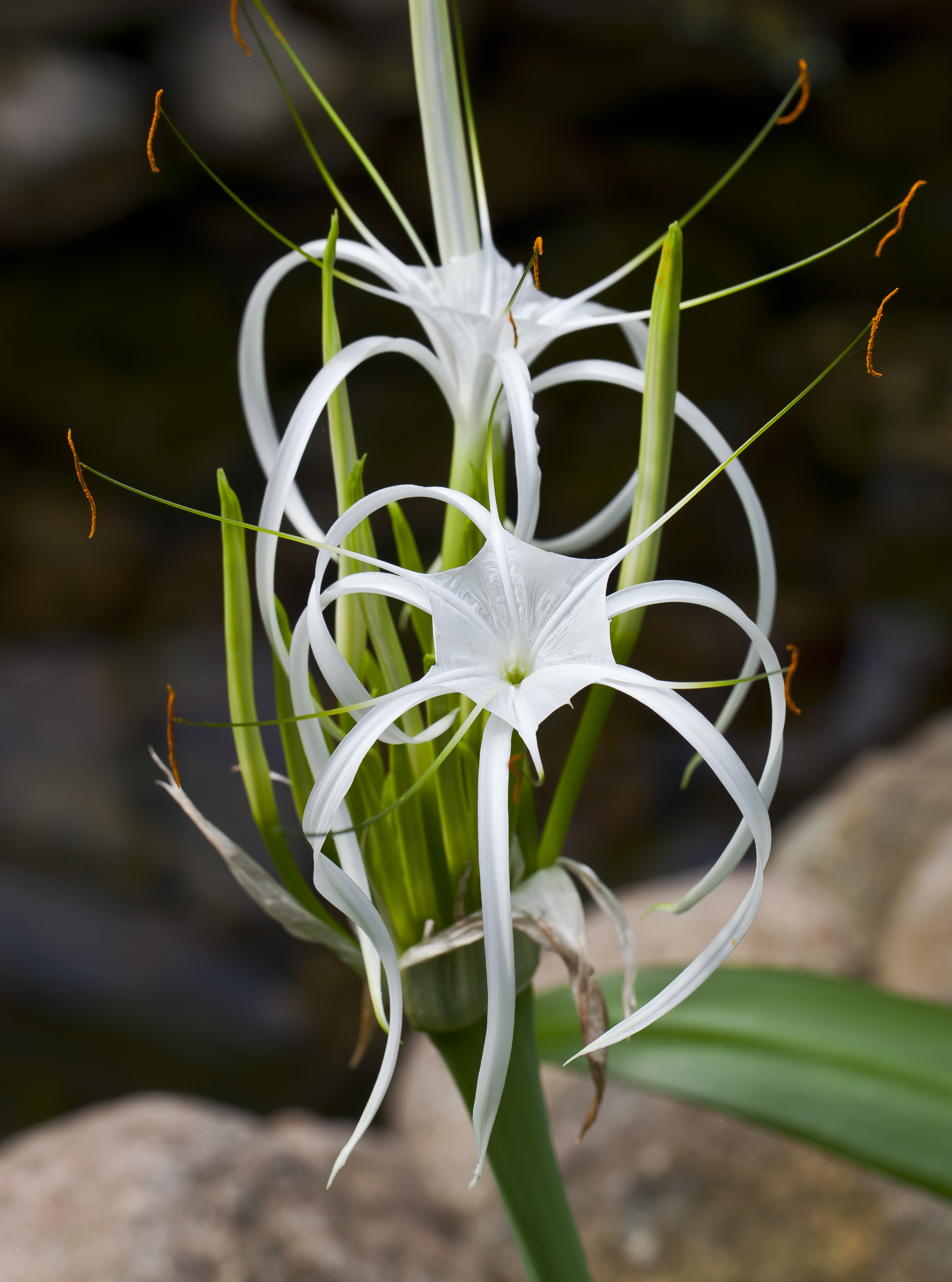

Scientific classification
- Kingdom: Plantae
- Clade: Tracheophytes
- Clade: Angiosperms
- Clade: Monocots
- Order: Asparagales
- Family: Amaryllidaceae
- Subfamily: Amaryllidoideae
- Genus: Hymenocallis
- Species: H. speciosa

Binomial name
- Hymenocallis speciosa (L. f. ex Salisb.) Salisb.

Synonyms
- Pancratium speciosumL. f. ex Salisb.; Hymenocallis formosa M.Roem.; Hymenocallis speciosa var. angustifolia Herb.; Hymenocallis speciosa var. humilis Herb.; Hymenocallis speciosa var. longipetiolata Herb.; Nemepiodon speciosum (L.f. ex Salisb.) Raf.; Pancratium formosum M.Roem.

= Hymenocallis speciosa =

Green-tinge spiderlily

Species of flowering plant

Hymenocallis speciosa, the green-tinge spiderlily, is a species of the genus Hymenocallis that is native to the Windward Islands in the eastern Caribbean. It is cultivated as an ornamental in some areas, and reportedly naturalized in Cuba and the Bahamas.

Hymenocallis speciosa is a bulb-forming perennial. Stipe can attain a height of up to 50 cm. Leaves are lanceolate, up to 50 cm long and 10 cm across, narrowing to a petiole below. One umbel can produce as many as 20 flowers. Flowers are white with a slight greenish tinge, the tepals reflexed (curling backwards) at flowering time.
