= Spider lily =

Spider lily is the common name for a number of different plant species within the subfamily Amaryllidoideae which belong to the following genera:

- Crinum, a genus of about 180 species of perennial plants in the family Amaryllidaceae found along the sides of streams and lakes in tropical and subtropical areas worldwide, including South Africa
- Hymenocallis, a genus of plants in the family Amaryllidaceae
- Lycoris, a genus of 13–20 species of flowering plants in the family Amaryllidaceae, formerly often treated in the family Liliaceae
- Nerine, a genus of about 20–30 species of South African plants in the family Amaryllidaceae
Plants called spider lily
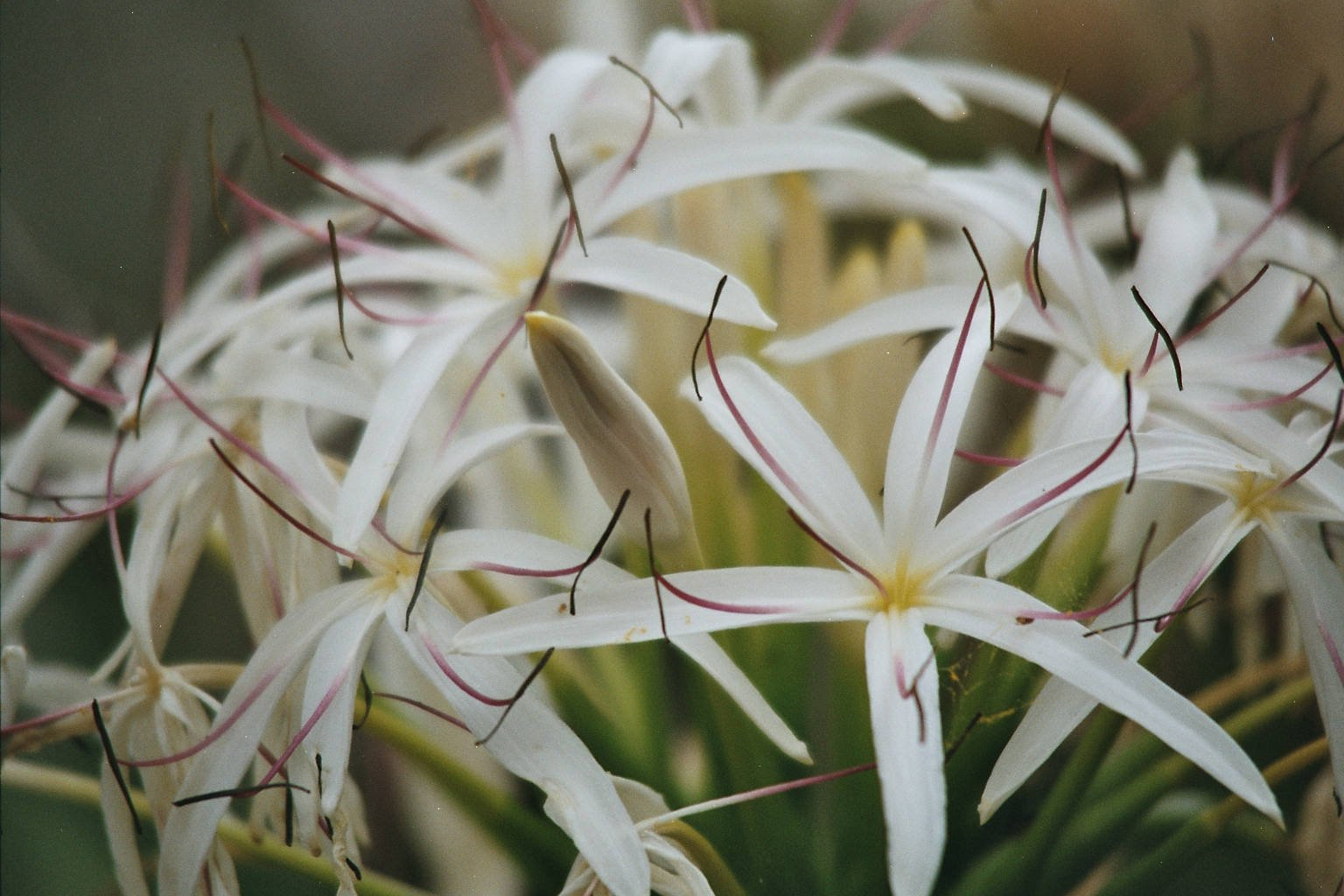
Crinum

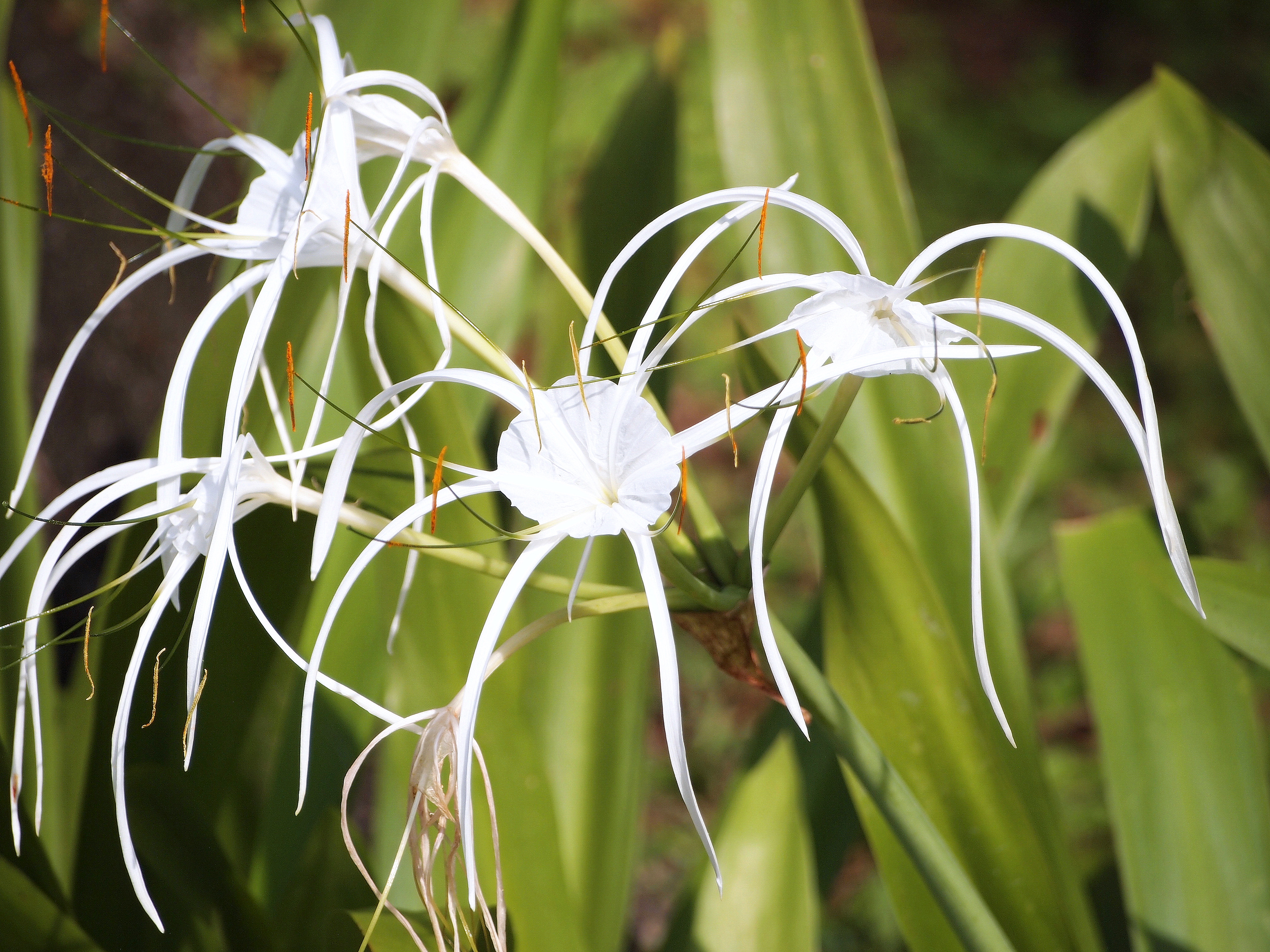
Hymenocallis in Malaysia

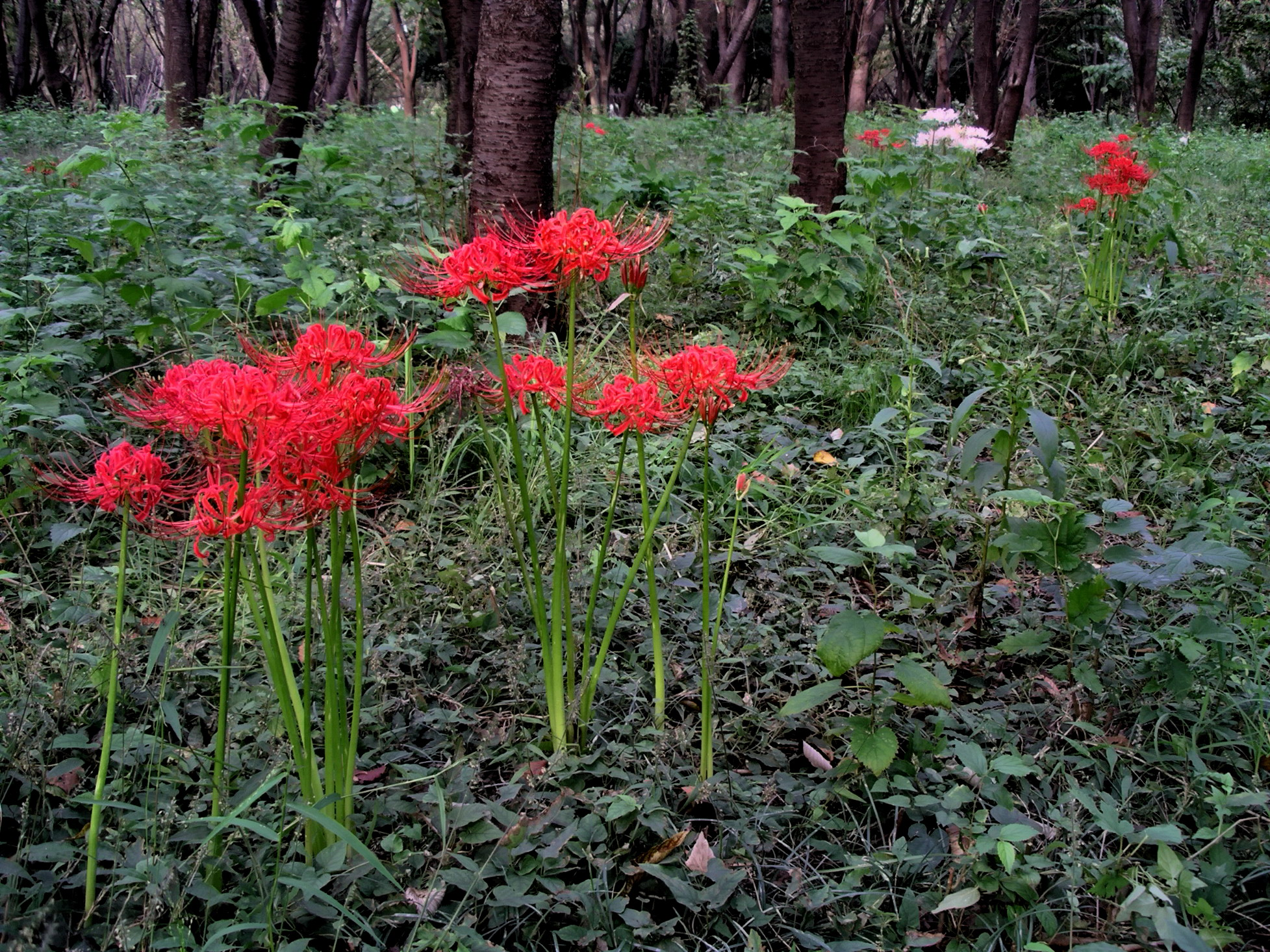
Lycoris
