= Flora of Florida =

Plant species of Florida, United States

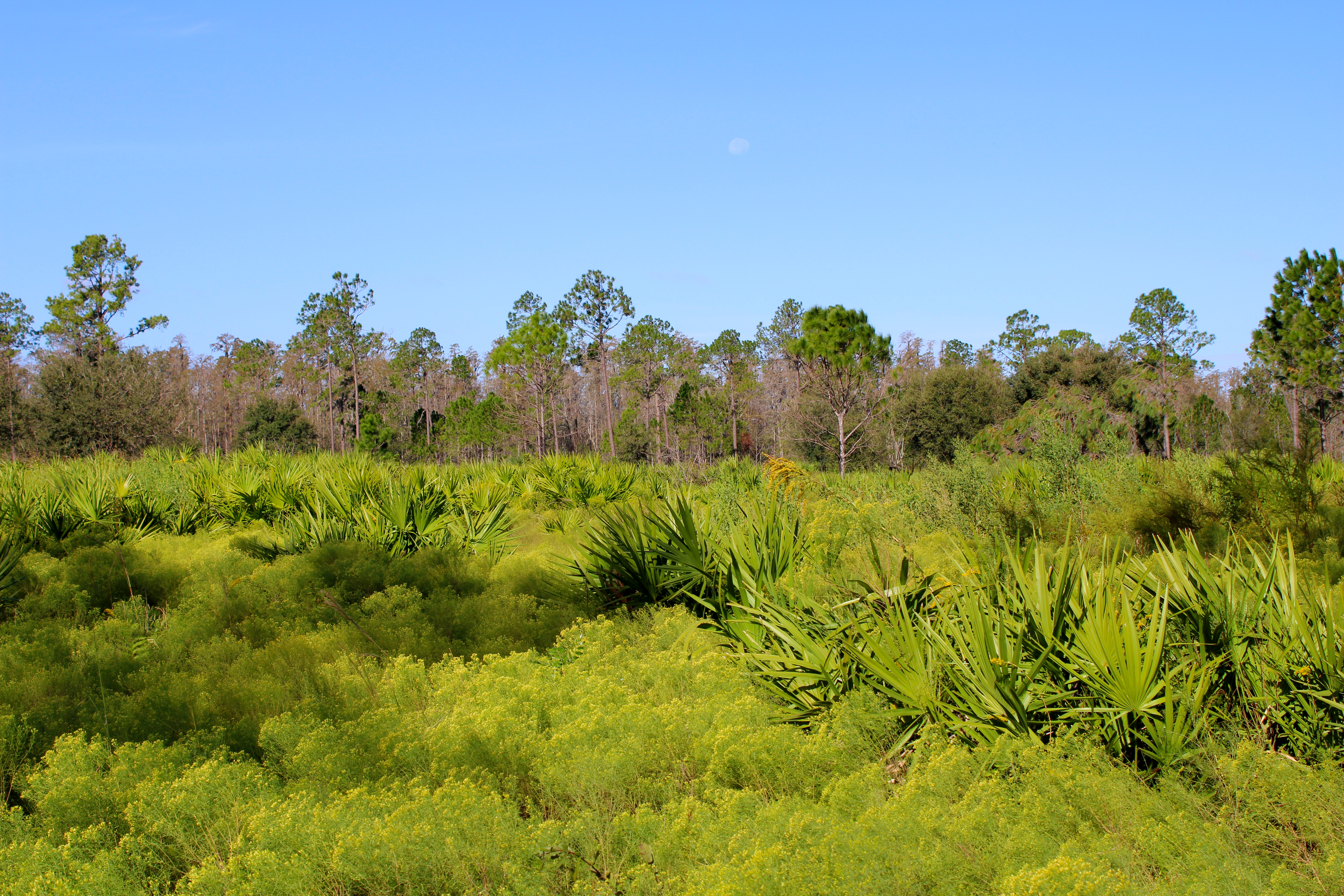
Lower Green Swamp Preserve in Plant City, Florida

Emerson Point Preserve in Palmetto, Florida

The Flora of Florida includes species that grow in the Florida panhandle and peninsular Florida including various endemics. There are more than 4,000 native and naturalized plants in the state. Florida is the third most floristically diverse state in the United States. Hundreds of Florida's plant species are endangered or threatened.

The genus Coreopsis is the state wildflower.

== Geography ==
Florida borders the Atlantic Ocean on its east coast and the Gulf of Mexico on its west coast and south of the Florida panhandle. Florida has extensive coastline with areas of mangrove, sea grape, dunes, beaches, and barrier islands. The state is relatively flat and has a rainy season during which hurricanes occur. The state has extensive wetland areas including saltmarsh and areas of freshwater. Habitats include bayswamp, coastland strand, cypress swamp, pineland, sandhill, scrub, dry prairie, and bottomland.

== Geology ==
Once part of Gondwana, sediments from the Appalachian Mountains established the above water lands of Florida (Geology of Florida).

Much of Florida was formerly under water.

== History ==
Florida fauna formerly included megalodon sharks and later to mammoth, mastodon, glyptodon, giant sloth, horses, camel, and saber-tooth tiger, jaguar, wolves, and other species (List of the prehistoric life of Florida).

Various indigenous peoples lives in what is now Florida. Botanists who explored Florida include John Bartram in 1765 and his American born son William Bartram.

== Organizations ==
There is a Florida Native Plant Society. It manages a databse of Florida's plants.

== Literature ==
Rare tropical trees of south Florida, readable pdf

A Bibliography of South Florida Botany by Lloyd L. Loope was published in 1980. Books on Florida's plants include the Guide to the Vascular Plants of Florida by Richard P. Wunderlin and Bruce F. Hansen.

== Protected areas ==
Federal, state, and local jurisdictions lanage protected areas in Florida. There are 176 Florida state parks as well as properties managed by regional water management districts. The endemic Torreya taxifolia are at Torreya State Park.

Florida is home to panther, bobcat, turkey, coyote, gooher tortoise, bear, snook, alligator, crocodile, manatee, butterflies, beetles, cicada, and many other species that depend on its habitats.

== Plants ==
Agriculture in Florida includes various fruit trees such as orange, grapefruit, pomelo, kumquat, loquat, mango, lychee, dragonfruit, and papaya. Various berries are also grown in the state. The orange blossom (Citrus sinensis) is the state flower. Cabbage palm, Spanish moss, and longleaf pine have also been historically inportant in the state. Species of Asimina, cacti, orchid, and palm are significant.

Species of milkweed in Florida are important host plants for butterflies. Coontie (Zamia integrifolia) is the host plant for the Atala butterfly (Eumaeus atala).

=== Endemic plants ===
There are about 230 endemic plant species in Florida. There are entries on 141 endemic plant species on Wikipedia.

- Agave decipiens
- Amaranthus floridanus
- Amorpha crenulata
- Argythamnia blodgettii
- Aristida rhizomophora
- Arnoglossum album
- Arnoglossum floridanum
- Asclepias curtissii
- Asimina manasota
- Asimina obovata
- Asimina pulchella
- Asimina rugelii
- Asimina tetramera
- Berlandiera subacaulis
- Boltonia apalachicolensis
- Bonamia grandiflora
- Cartrema floridana
- Carya floridana
- Centrosema arenicola
- Chionanthus pygmaeus
- Chromolaena frustrata
- Chrysopsis delaneyi
- Chrysopsis floridana
- Chrysopsis highlandsensis
- Chrysopsis lanuginosa
- Chrysopsis latisquamea
- Chrysopsis linearifolia
- Chrysopsis subulata
- Clematis baldwinii
- Clitoria fragrans
- Coleataenia abscissa
- Conradina brevifolia
- Conradina etonia
- Conradina glabra
- Conradina grandiflora
- Consolea corallicola
- Crocanthemum nashii
- Crotalaria avonensis
- Ctenitis sloanei
- Cuphea aspera
- Dalea adenopoda
- Dicerandra christmanii
- Dicerandra cornutissima
- Dicerandra frutescens
- Dicerandra immaculata
- Dicerandra modesta
- Digitaria floridana
- Digitaria gracillima
- Digitaria pauciflora
- Eriocaulon nigrobracteatum
- Eryngium cuneifolium
- Eupatorium mikanioides
- Euphorbia deltoidea
- Euphorbia garberi
- Euphorbia polyphylla
- Euphorbia telephioides
- Eurybia spinulosa
- Flaveria floridana
- Galactia smallii
- Garberia
- Glandularia tampensis
- Harperocallis flava
- Harrisia aboriginum
- Harrisia fragrans
- Harrisia simpsonii
- Hasteola robertiorum
- Helianthus carnosus
- Hymenocallis franklinensis
- Hymenocallis godfreyi
- Hymenocallis henryae
- Hymenocallis palmeri
- Hymenocallis puntagordensis
- Hymenocallis rotata
- Hymenocallis tridentata
- Hypericum cumulicola
- Hypericum lissophloeus
- Jacquemontia reclinata
- Johnson's seagrass
- Justicia cooleyi
- Lechea cernua
- Lechea divaricata
- Lechea lakelae
- Liatris ohlingerae
- Liatris provincialis
- Liatris savannensis
- Linum arenicola
- Litrisa
- Litrisa carnosa
- Lupinus aridorum
- Lupinus cumulicola
- Lythrum flagellare
- Macbridea alba
- Magnolia ashei
- Monotropsis reynoldsiae
- Nemastylis floridana
- Nolina brittoniana
- Opuntia ammophila
- Palafoxia feayi
- Paronychia chartacea
- Phoebanthus grandiflorus
- Physostegia godfreyi
- Pinguicula ionantha
- Polygonum basiramia
- Polygonum delopyrum
- Polygonum dentoceras
- Polygonum nesomii
- Protocodon
- Prunus geniculata
- Pseudoziziphus celata
- Quercus inopina
- Rhododendron minus var. chapmanii
- Rhynchospora megaplumosa
- Rotanthella
- Sabal etonia
- Sabal miamiensis
- Salpingostylis
- Sandhill oak
- Schizachyrium niveum
- Scutellaria floridana
- Senega lewtonii
- Senega rugelii
- Senega smallii
- Spermacoce neoterminalis
- Stachydeoma
- Symphyotrichum fontinale
- Symphyotrichum plumosum
- Tamala humilis
- Taxus floridana
- Tephrosia mysteriosa
- Tillandsia × floridana
- Tillandsia simulata
- Tillandsia × smalliana
- Trichostema gracile
- Trichostema hobe
- Trichostema latens
- Trichostema microphyllum
- Trichostema suffrutescens
- Triphora craigheadii
- Warea amplexifolia
- Warea carteri
- Xyris correlliorum, Correll's yelloweyed grass

=== Invasives ===
Invasive plant species include cogongrass, hydrilla, Brazilian pepper, Caesar weed, melaleuca, and air potato.

== See also ==
- Ecology of Florida
- Florida scrub
- Florida scrub jay
- Flora of the United States
- Lake Wales Ridge
- Brooksville Ridge
