= Sky blue lupine =

Sky blue lupine is a common name for several plants and may refer to:

- Lupinus cumulicola
- Lupinus diffusus
