= Warea =

Warea may refer to:

- Warea (plant), a genus of plants
- Warea, New Zealand, a community in the west of Taranaki, New Zealand
