= Devil's tongue =

Devil's tongue may refer to:

- Amorphophallus konjac, a flowering plant native to southwest China
- Dominican Devil's Tongue, or Red Savina pepper, a cultivar of the habanero chili
- two species of cactus from genus Opuntia
  - Opuntia humifusa, also known as the Eastern prickly pear, native to eastern United States and northeastern Mexico
  - Opuntia ammophila, native to Florida
- Devil's Tongue Battery a former artillery battery in the British Overseas Territory of Gibraltar
