= Tillandsia × smalliana =

Scientific classification
- Kingdom: Plantae
- Clade: Tracheophytes
- Clade: Angiosperms
- Clade: Monocots
- Clade: Commelinids
- Order: Poales
- Family: Bromeliaceae
- Genus: Tillandsia
- Species: T. × smalliana

Binomial name
- Tillandsia × smalliana H.Luther

Hybrid species of plant

Tillandsia × smalliana is a natural hybrid (T. balbisiana × T. fasciculata) in the genus Tillandsia. This plant is native to the US state of Florida. Some reports indicate that it may formerly have existed also in Central America, but is now apparently extinct there.

The name is not considered to be validly published because its initial 1985 coinage was not accompanied by a Latin description.
