= Tillandsia × floridana =

Scientific classification
- Kingdom: Plantae
- Clade: Tracheophytes
- Clade: Angiosperms
- Clade: Monocots
- Clade: Commelinids
- Order: Poales
- Family: Bromeliaceae
- Genus: Tillandsia
- Species: T. × floridana

Binomial name
- Tillandsia × floridana L.B.Sm.

Synonyms
- Tillandsia fasciculata var. floridana L.B.Sm.

Species of plant

Tillandsia × floridana is a natural hybrid (T. fasciculata × T. bartramii) of the genus Tillandsia. This plant is endemic to the state of Florida in the United States.
