= Warea sessilifolia =

Scientific classification
- Kingdom: Plantae
- Clade: Tracheophytes
- Clade: Angiosperms
- Clade: Eudicots
- Clade: Rosids
- Order: Brassicales
- Family: Brassicaceae
- Genus: Warea
- Species: W. sessilifolia

Binomial name
- Warea sessilifolia Nash

Species of flowering plant

Warea sessilifolia is a species of flowering plant in the Warea genus and Brassicaceae family. It grows in the Florida panhandle, Alabama, and Georgia. An annual dicot, its common name is sessileleaf pinelandcress. It produces dark pink flowers and narrow curved fruit pods. It grows up to 3 feet high. Its name sessilifolia refers to its stemless leaves.

W. sessilifolia has been observed in habitat types such as slash pine plantations, scrub oak barrens, and oak-wiregrass areas. It has also been found in disturbed areas such as alongside roads and within disturbed pinewoods.
