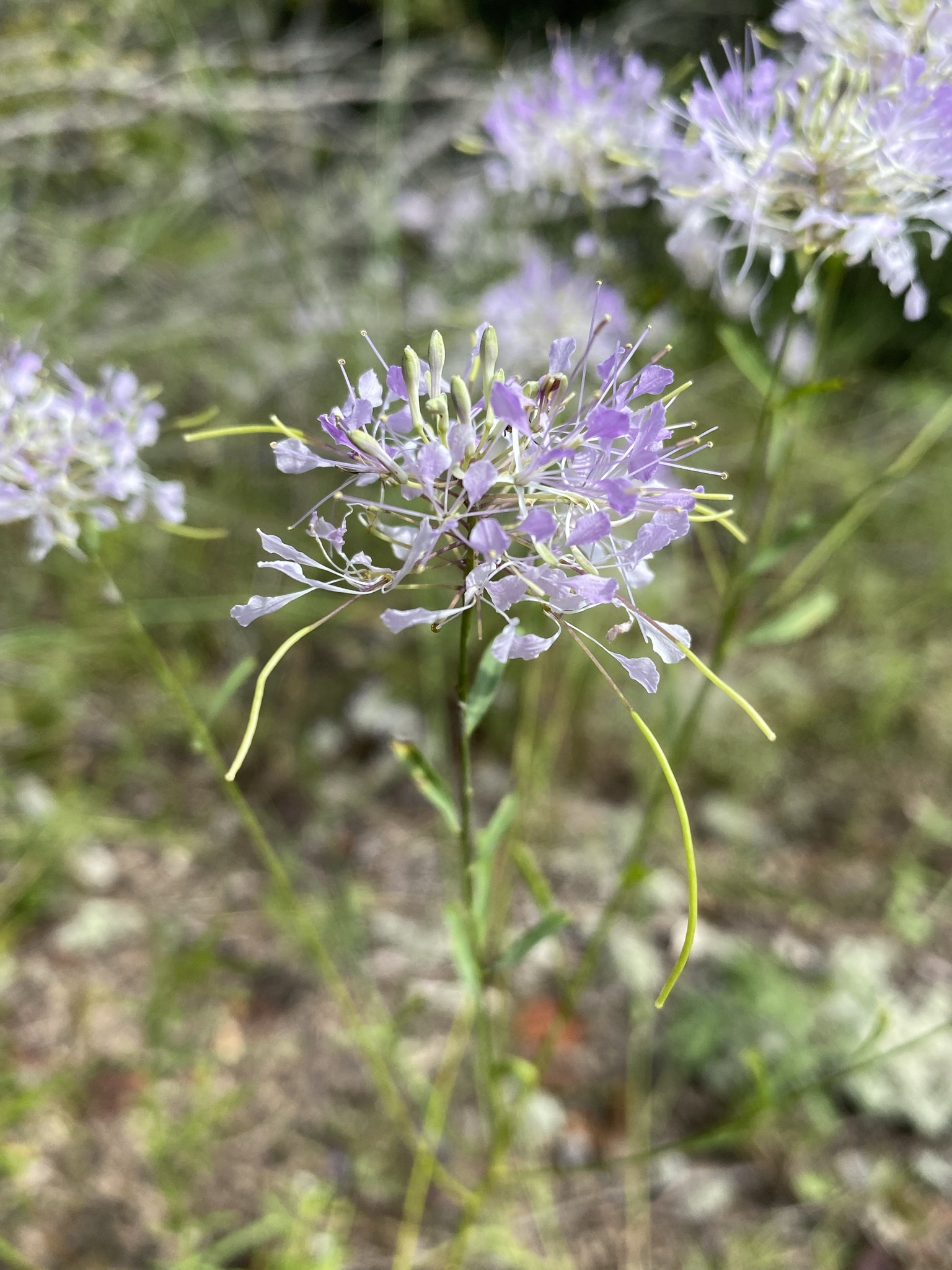

Scientific classification
- Kingdom: Plantae
- Clade: Tracheophytes
- Clade: Angiosperms
- Clade: Eudicots
- Clade: Rosids
- Order: Brassicales
- Family: Brassicaceae
- Genus: Warea
- Species: W. cuneifolia

Binomial name
- Warea cuneifolia (Muhl. ex Nutt.) Nutt.

= Warea cuneifolia =

Species of flowering plant

Warea cuneifolia is a species of annual flowering plant native to North America. It grows in the Florida Panhandle, sections of Alabama, and South Carolina. It goes by the common name Carolina pinelandcress. It has pom pom like purple or pinkish flowers.

W. cuneifolia has been found in habitat types such as longleaf pine woods, sandhills, and open scrub oak systems.
