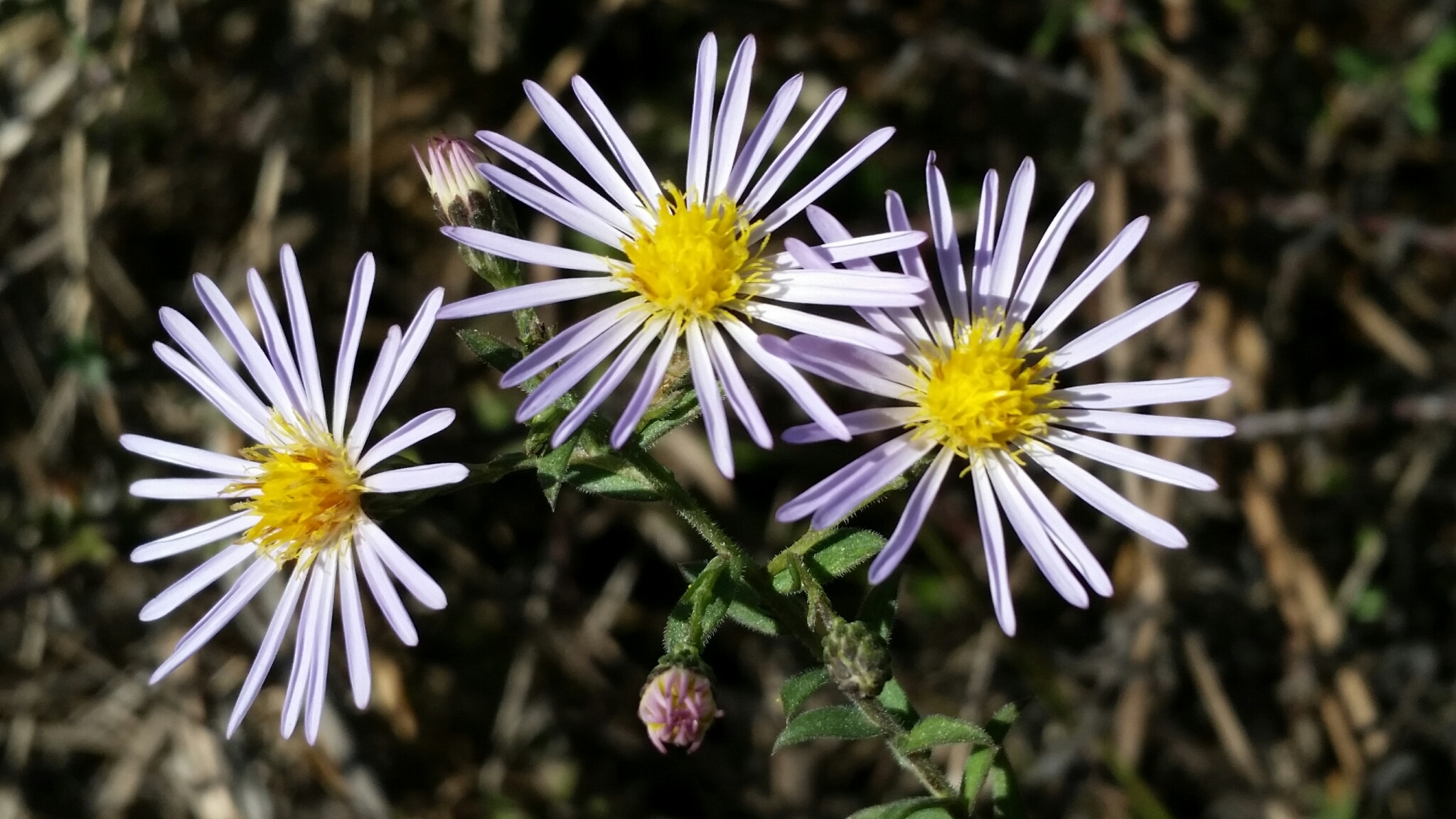

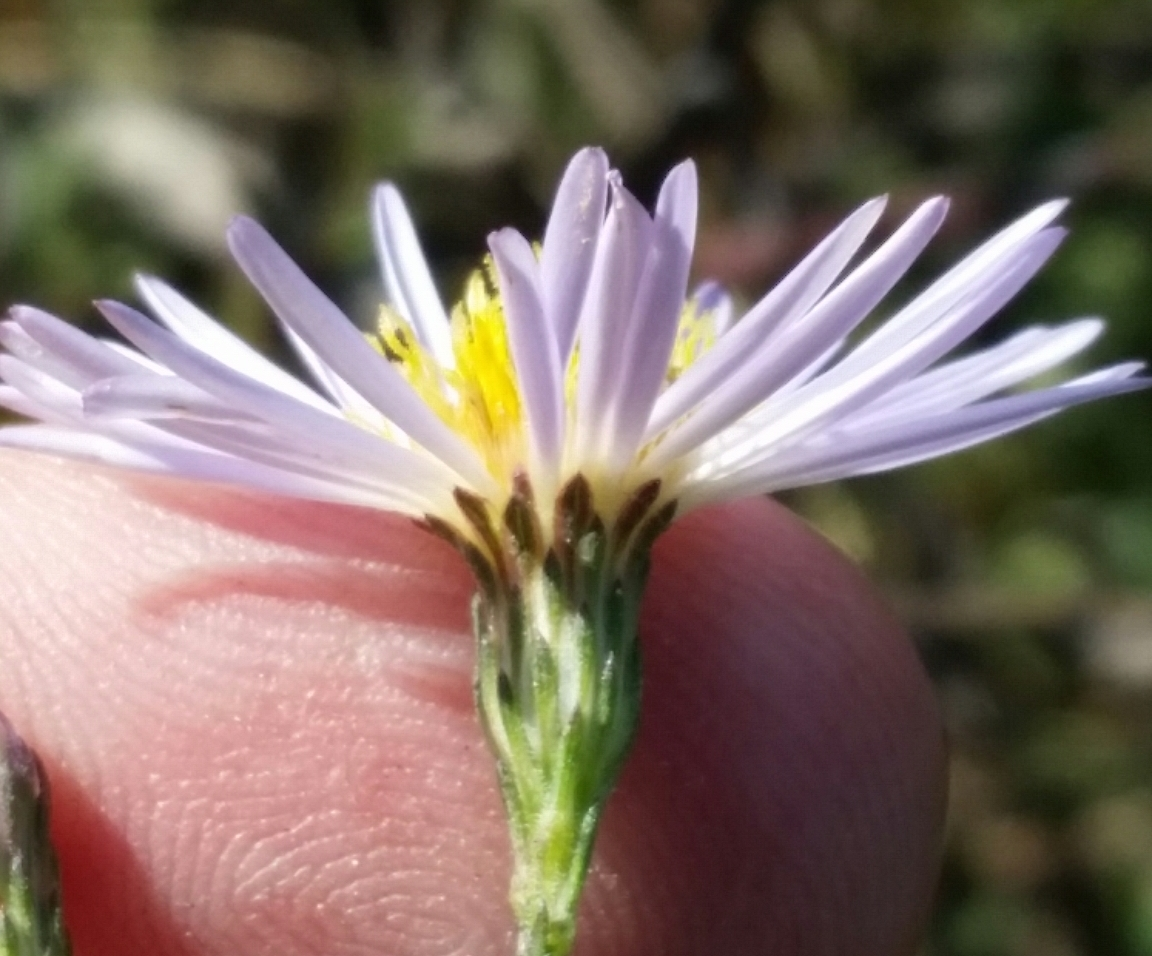

Conservation status
- Vulnerable (NatureServe)

Scientific classification
- Kingdom: Plantae
- Clade: Tracheophytes
- Clade: Angiosperms
- Clade: Eudicots
- Clade: Asterids
- Order: Asterales
- Family: Asteraceae
- Tribe: Astereae
- Subtribe: Symphyotrichinae
- Genus: Symphyotrichum
- Subgenus: Symphyotrichum subg. Virgulus
- Section: Symphyotrichum sect. Grandiflori
- Species: S. fontinale

Binomial name
- Symphyotrichum fontinale (Alexander) G.L.Nesom
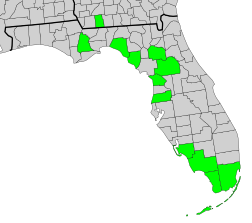
- S. fontinale distribution

Synonyms
- Aster fontinalis Alexander ex Small; Aster patens var. floridanus R.W.Long

= Symphyotrichum fontinale =

Species of plant in the aster family

Symphyotrichum fontinale is a species of flowering plant in the family Asteraceae endemic to Florida and a small area of southwest Georgia. It has the common names of Florida water aster and Florida water American-aster. S. fontinale is a perennial, herbaceous plant that may reach 30–90 centimeters (1–3 feet) in height.

== Description ==
S. fontinale is a perennial, herbaceous plant that may reach 30–90 centimeters (1–3 feet) in height. There can be up to 400 flower heads on each plant distributed in panicles that are covered with many small leaves. Each flower head has 15–30 purplish-blue to lavender ray florets and 19–25 disk florets that start out as cream to pale yellow and then turn reddish purple, sometimes brown.

== Distribution and habitat ==
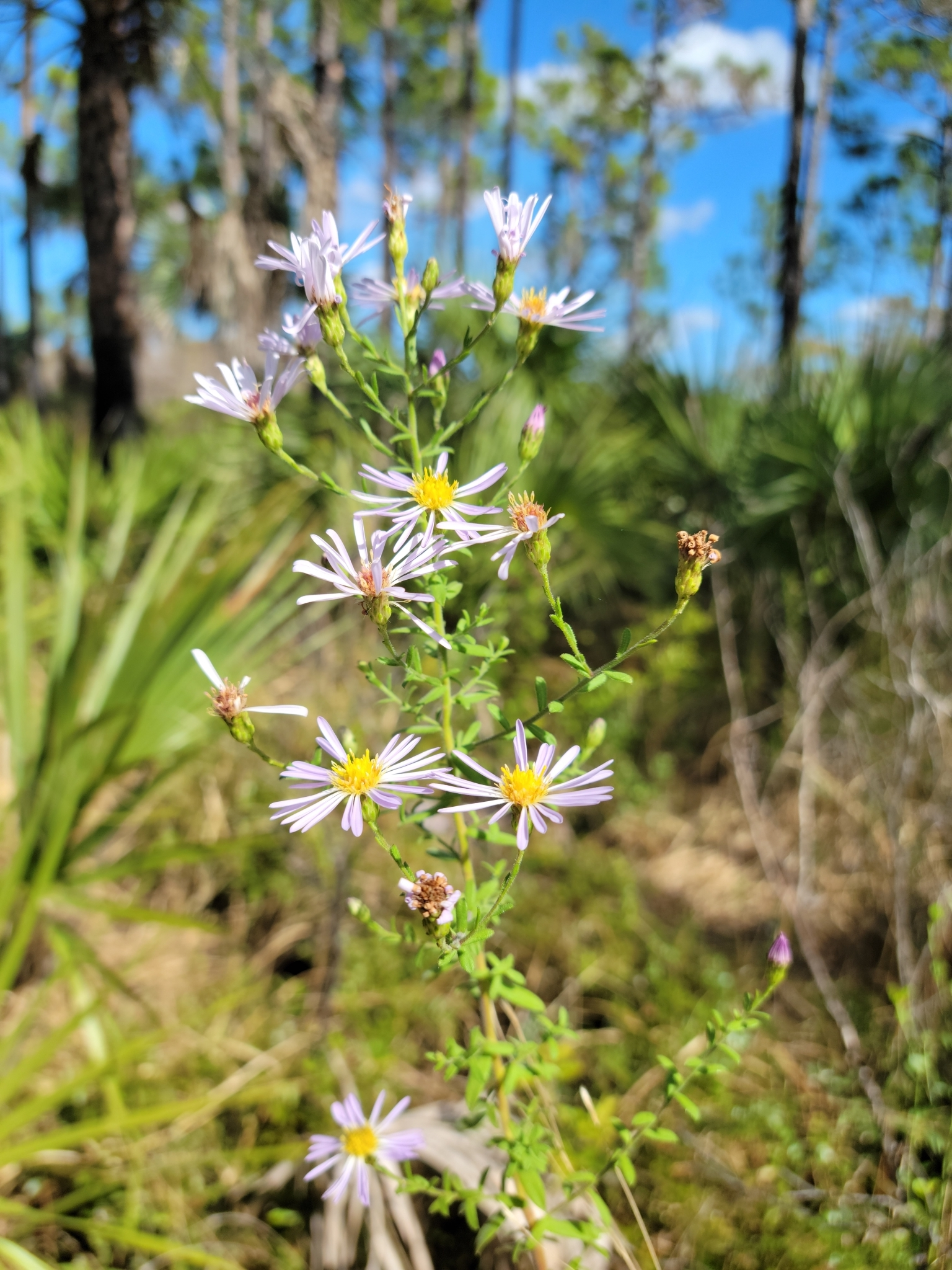
S. fontinale in Collier County, Florida, US

Symphyotrichum fontinale is endemic to Florida and a small area of southwest Georgia. It grows at elevations up to 50 meters (160 feet) in wetlands, including marshes, sandhills, hammocks, flood plains, and rocky bluffs along streams, in scattered counties of Florida and southwest Georgia.

== Conservation ==
NatureServe lists it as Vulnerable (G3) worldwide. This status was last reviewed on 7 June 1996.
