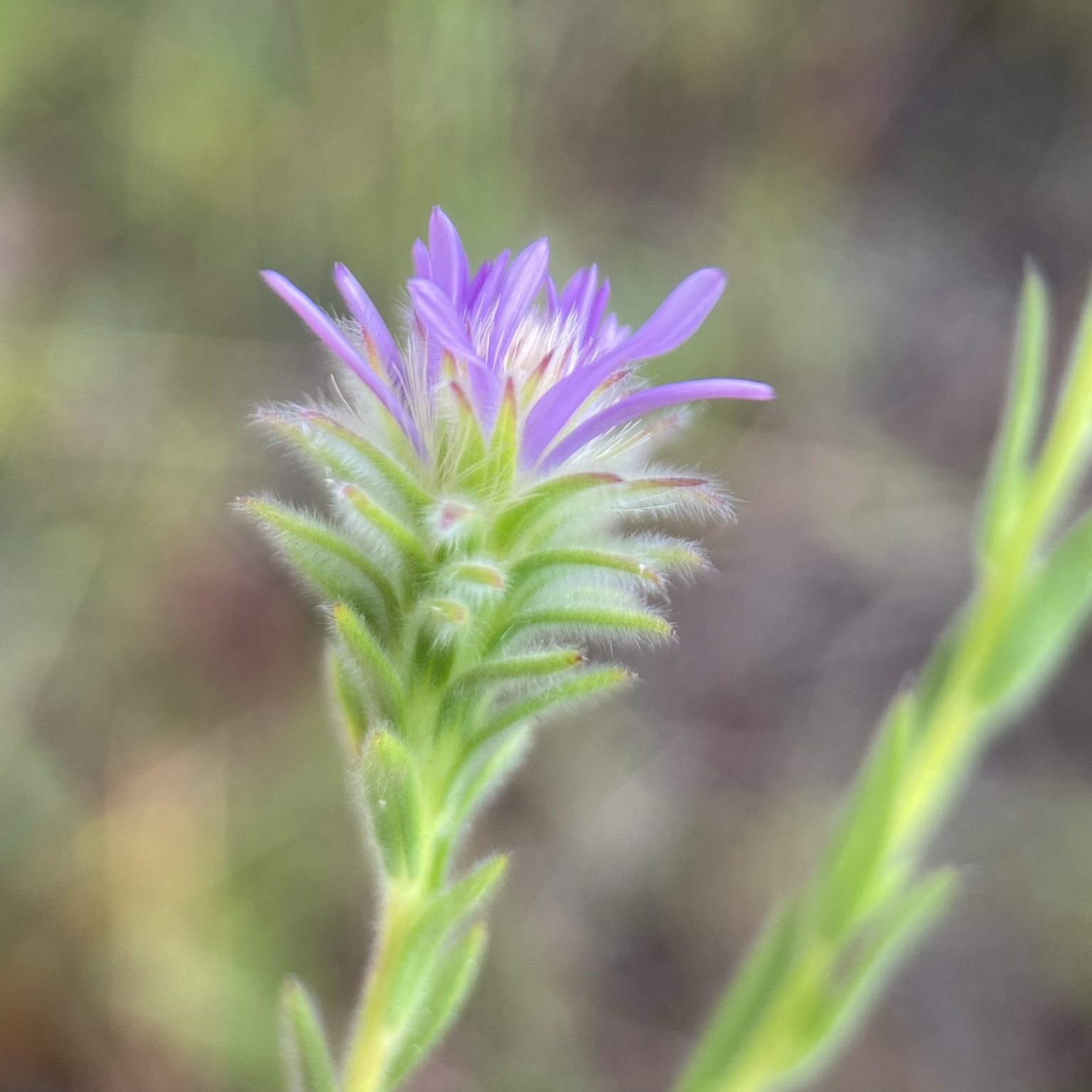

Conservation status
- Imperiled (NatureServe)

Scientific classification
- Kingdom: Plantae
- Clade: Tracheophytes
- Clade: Angiosperms
- Clade: Eudicots
- Clade: Asterids
- Order: Asterales
- Family: Asteraceae
- Tribe: Astereae
- Subtribe: Symphyotrichinae
- Genus: Symphyotrichum
- Subgenus: Symphyotrichum subg. Virgulus
- Species: S. plumosum

Binomial name
- Symphyotrichum plumosum (Small) Semple
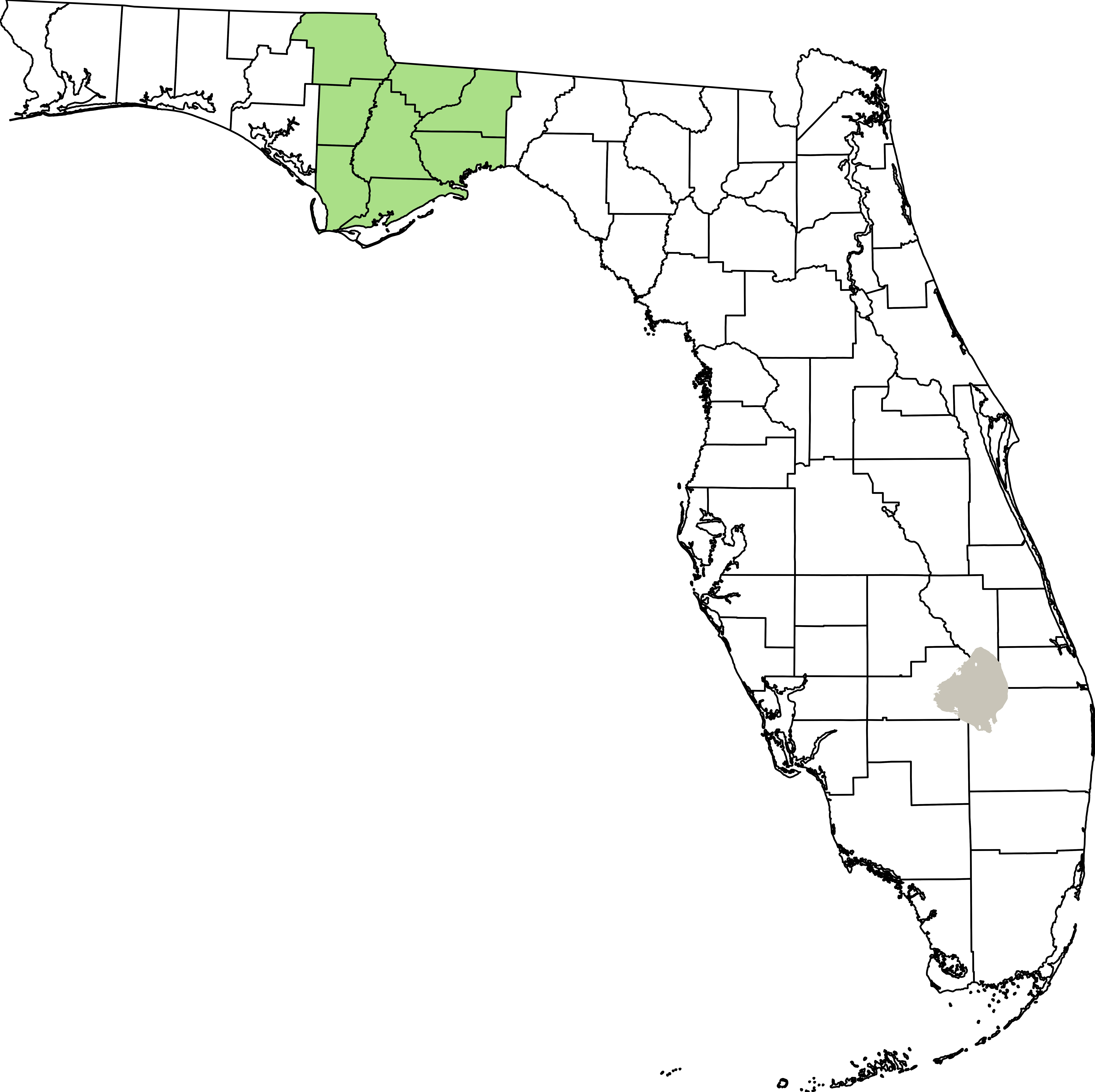
- Data for map from NatureServe

Synonyms
- Aster plumosus Small; Symphyotrichum concolor var. plumosum (Small) Wunderlin & B.F.Hansen

= Symphyotrichum plumosum =

Species of flowering plant in the daisy family

Symphyotrichum plumosum (formerly Aster plumosus) is a species of flowering plant in the family Asteraceae endemic to Florida in the United States. Commonly known as plumose aster, it is a perennial, herbaceous plant that may reach 40 to 100 centimeters (1 1/4 to 3 1/4 feet) tall. Its flowers have rose-purple ray florets and yellow turning to purple disk florets. It is of conservation concern.

== Gallery ==
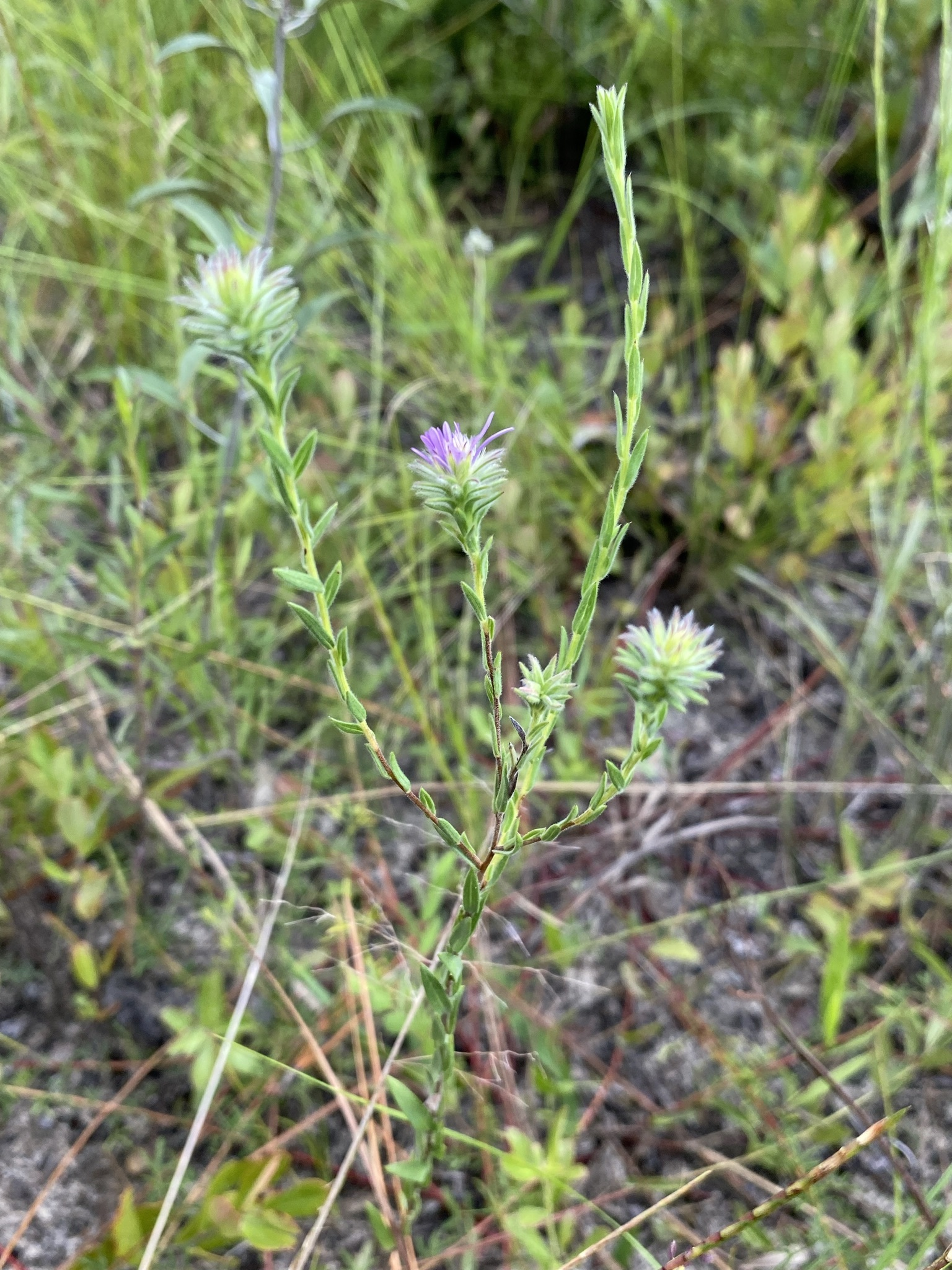

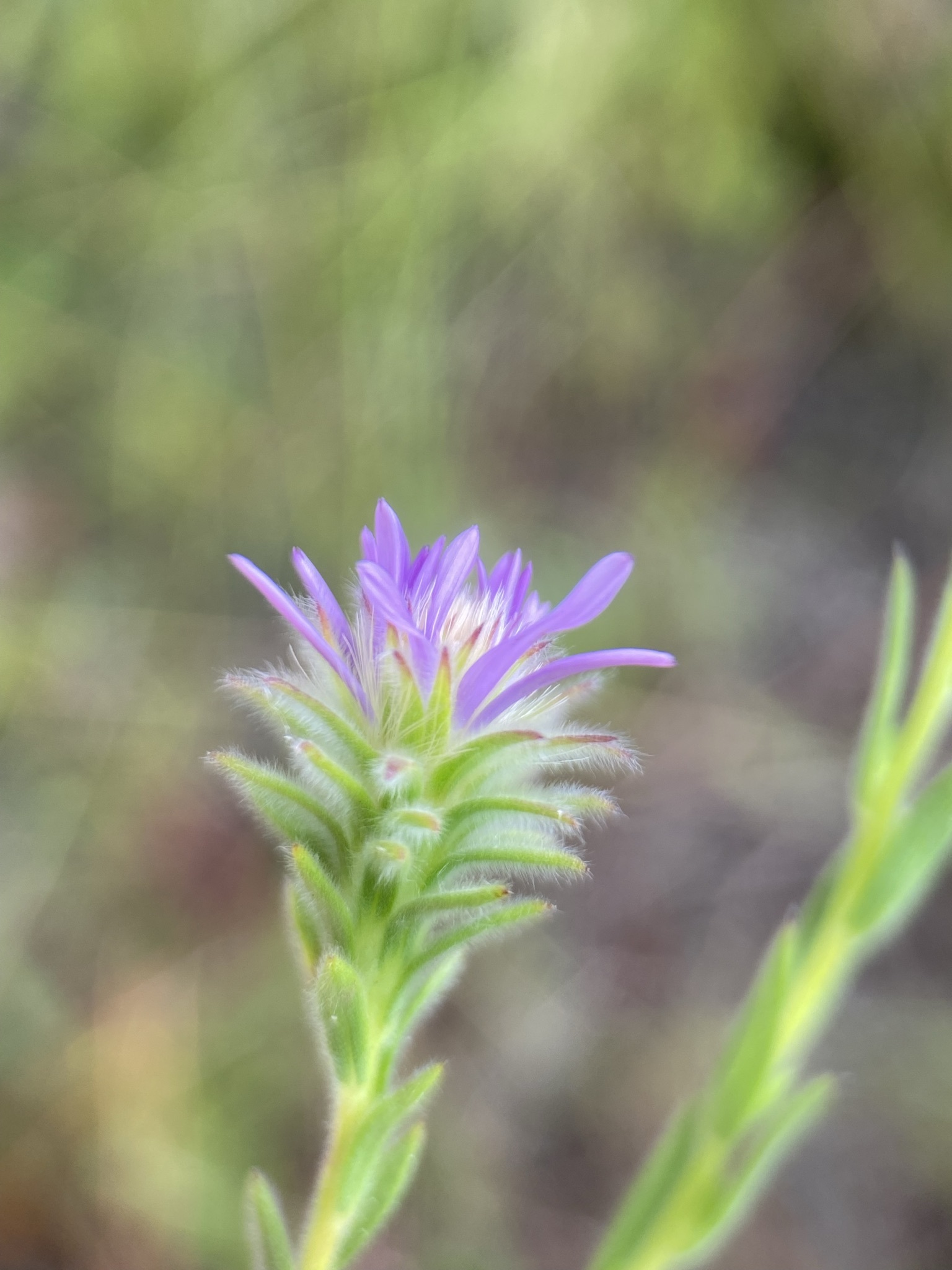

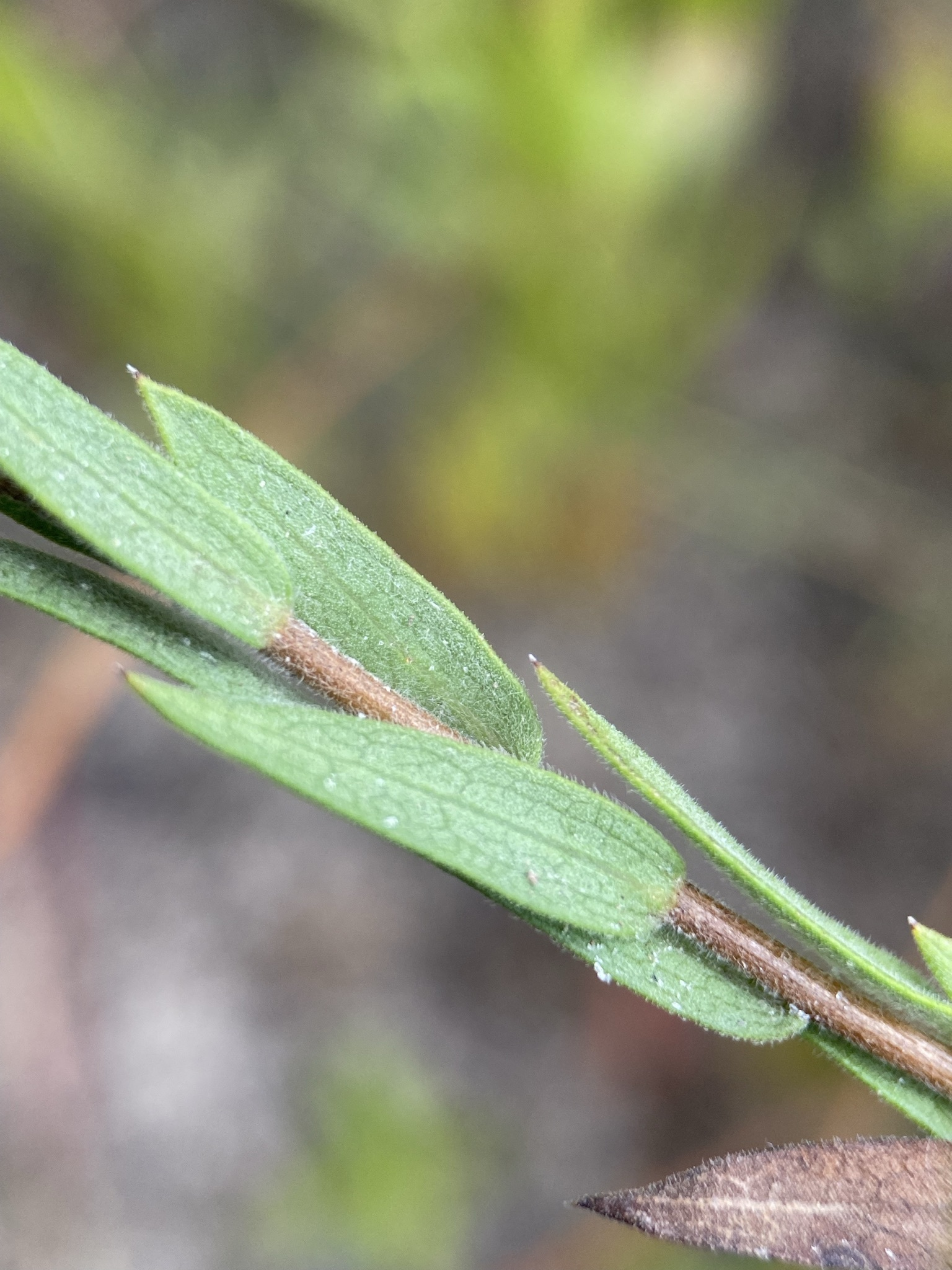

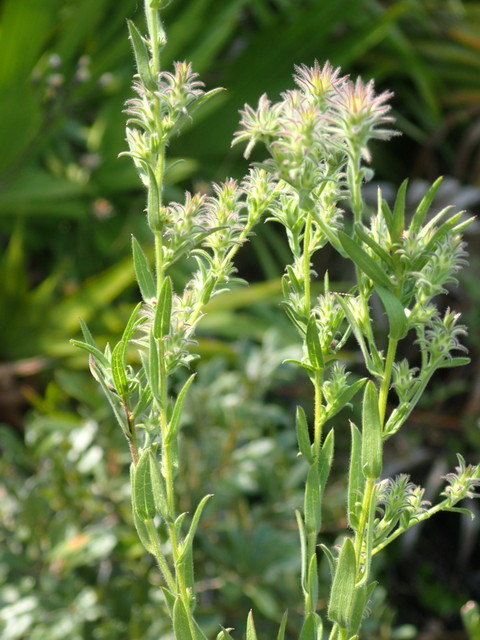
