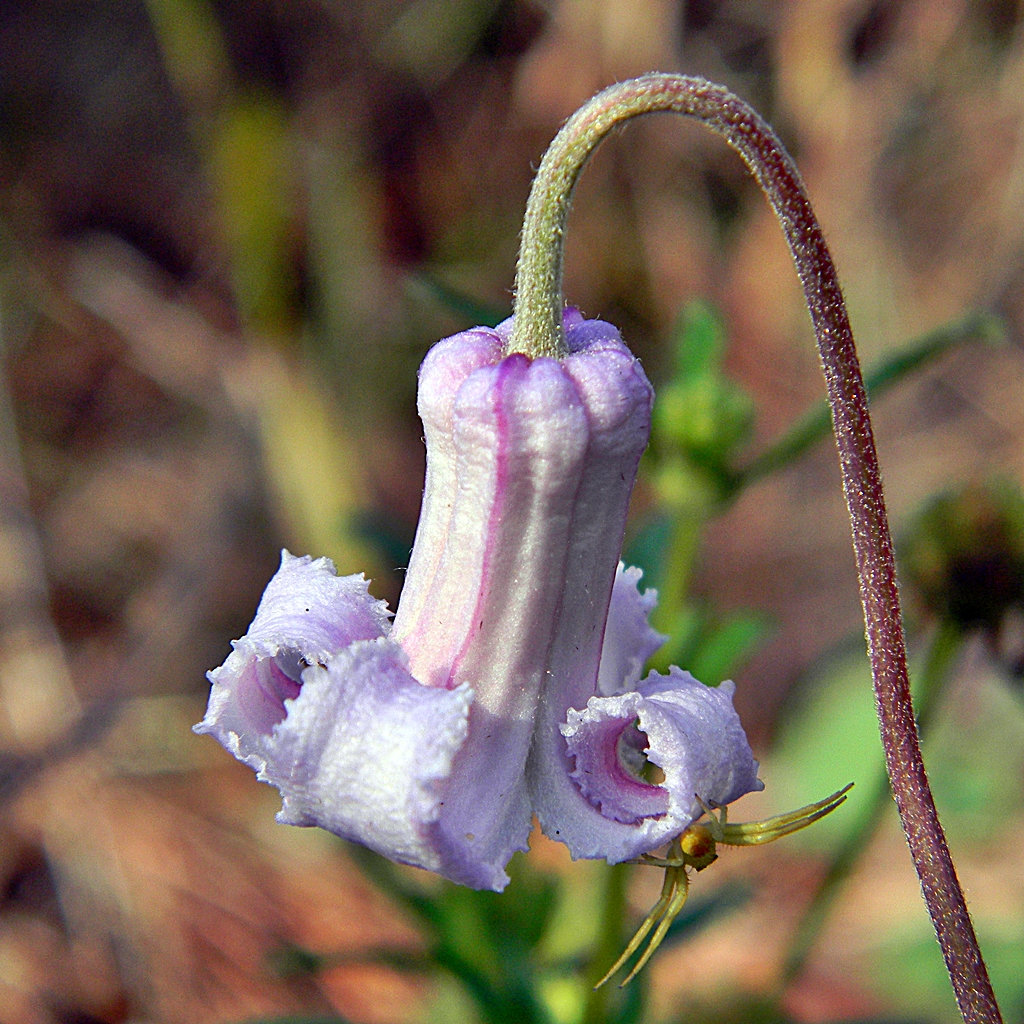
- Flowers are pendant.

Scientific classification
- Kingdom: Plantae
- Clade: Embryophytes
- Clade: Tracheophytes
- Clade: Spermatophytes
- Clade: Angiosperms
- Clade: Eudicots
- Order: Ranunculales
- Family: Ranunculaceae
- Genus: Clematis
- Species: C. baldwinii

Binomial name
- Clematis baldwinii Torr. & A.Gray

Synonyms
- Clematis baldwinii var. latiuscula R.W.Long; Coriflora baldwinii (Torr. & A.Gray) W.A.Weber; Viorna baldwinii (Torr. & A.Gray) Small

= Clematis baldwinii =

Species of flowering plant

Clematis baldwinii, the pine hyacinth, is a species of flowering plant native to the U.S. state of Florida. It grows in moist flatwoods, prairies, and sand dunes. Its flowers are pinkish-white to lavender and bell-shaped. A perennial, it is named for American botanist William Baldwin.

== Description ==
Clematis baldwinii is an endemic perennial wildflower, which flourishes throughout much of the Florida peninsula. It typically blooms in spring through fall. Its flowers attract a variety of pollinators, while its fruit provides food for many birds and small wildlife.

Clematis baldwinii is a small, erect, non-vining, herbaceous clematis. It is a very small clematis in comparison with other species, growing 12 to 24 in (30 to 61 cm) tall, with a tendency to sprawl. The distinct, nodding flowers are fragrant, and are typically pinkish-white to lavender. No petals are present, but the four petal-like sepals are fused at the base, giving the bloom a bell- or urn-like shape. The sepals separate and become revolute as the flower opens. Sepal margins are thin and undulate. Flowers are solitary and borne on slender, unbranched stems. Leaves vary from oval- to lanceolate-shaped or may be pinnately divided. They are oppositely arranged. Fruits are achenes with long silky tails.
