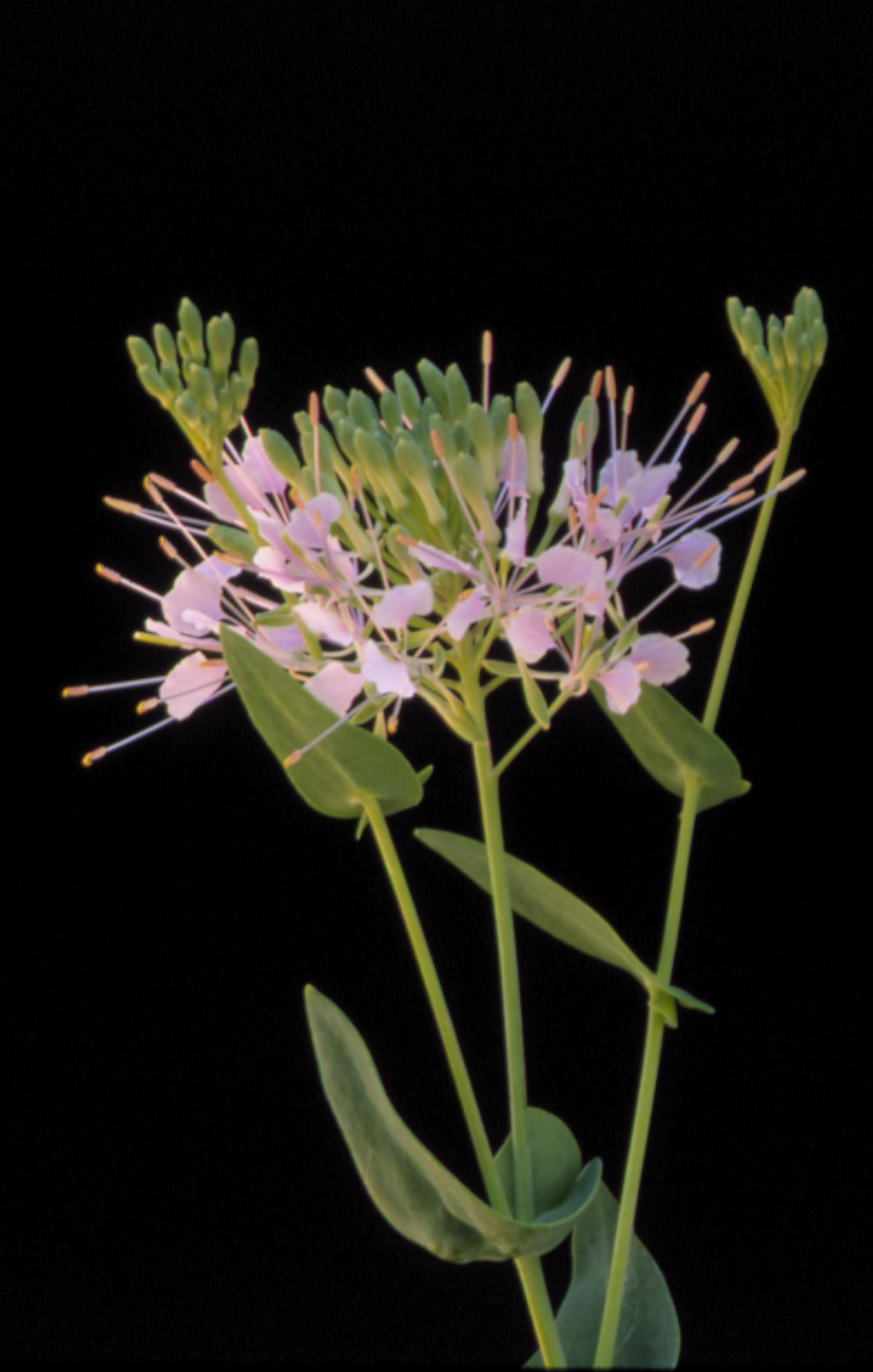

Conservation status
- Critically Imperiled (NatureServe)

Scientific classification
- Kingdom: Plantae
- Clade: Tracheophytes
- Clade: Angiosperms
- Clade: Eudicots
- Clade: Rosids
- Order: Brassicales
- Family: Brassicaceae
- Genus: Warea
- Species: W. amplexifolia

Binomial name
- Warea amplexifolia Nutt.

= Warea amplexifolia =

Species of flowering plant

Warea amplexifolia is a rare species of flowering plant in the mustard family known by the common names wideleaf pinelandcress, wide-leaf warea, and clasping warea. It is endemic to Florida in the United States, where it is limited to a few counties in the central part of the peninsula. It is threatened by the loss and degradation of its habitat. It is a federally listed endangered species of the United States.

This annual herb grows up to 70 or 80 centimeters in height. The leaves vary in shape, but they are always clasping: their bases encircle the stem, forming a ring around it. They sometimes have two lobes pointing in the opposite direction of the tip of the leaf blade. The leaves are up to 4 centimeters long. The inflorescence is a raceme of white, pink, or purplish flowers. The petals are somewhat spoon-shaped, with a fan-shaped blade narrowing into a very thin claw, the stalk that attaches to the flower. At the center are six long stamens which, at up to 1.5 centimeters in length, project far out of the flower. The fruit is a thin, narrow silique up to 7.5 centimeters long. Blooming occurs in August through October.

This plant occurs with many other endangered species on the Lake Wales Ridge of Central Florida in Lake, Polk, and Osceola Counties. It is a resident of the sandhill habitat, where it grows in open areas in dry woodlands. It does not tolerate shade and only occurs in these openings, which are generally kept open and clear of brush by wildfires. The most stable population of the species occurs at Lake Griffin State Park. An area of the park is artificially maintained, the brush cleared and native grasses, such as Aristida beyrichiana, planted.

Threats to the species include fire suppression, a practice which prevents the normal fire regime on which the plant depends. A number of exotic plant species have moved in, including Natal grass (Rhynchelytrum repens). The worst threat to the species is habitat destruction, as land is consumed for development and the establishment of citrus groves. Remaining habitat is not managed properly. Fires are prevented, resulting in the buildup of leaf litter and the encroachment of large and woody vegetation that shades out the herb layer. Drought may be a threat, because the plant appears to be most abundant when there is abundant rainfall.
