= Sea grape =

Sea grape or seagrape may refer to:

== Plants and algae ==
- Coccoloba uvifera, a flowering plant native to tropical America, including Florida, the Caribbean and nearby islands
- Seaweeds in the genus Caulerpa, especially:
  - C. lentillifera, eaten in Southeast Asia
  - C. racemosa
- Ephedra distachya, a shrub that grows in southern Europe and parts of western and central Asia
- Halosaccion glandiforme, another seaweed unrelated to Caulerpa
- Valonia ventricosa, an algae and one of the largest known unicellular organisms

== Animals ==
- Molgula manhattensis, a species of tunicate, or more generally any member of the genus Molgula
- Salpidae, planktonic, chain-forming tunicates, also known as salps
- The eggs of cuttlefish
