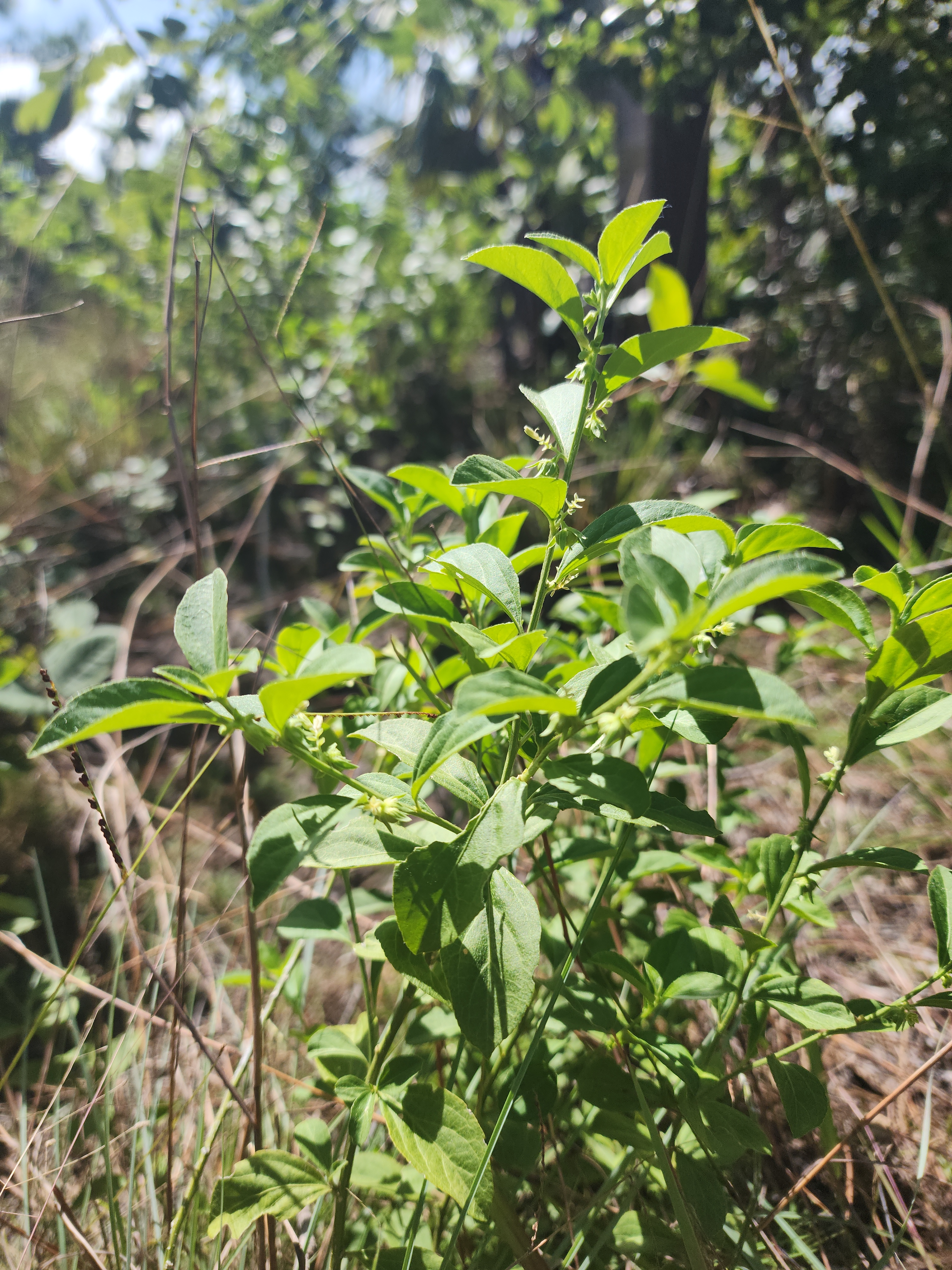
- Growing in open canopy pine rockland habitat

Conservation status
- Imperiled (NatureServe)

Scientific classification
- Kingdom: Plantae
- Clade: Tracheophytes
- Clade: Angiosperms
- Clade: Eudicots
- Clade: Rosids
- Order: Malpighiales
- Family: Euphorbiaceae
- Genus: Argythamnia
- Species: A. blodgettii

Binomial name
- Argythamnia blodgettii Torrey ex Chapman

= Argythamnia blodgettii =

Species of flowering plant

Argythamnia blodgettii, commonly referred to as Blodgett's silverbush or Blodgett's wild mercury, is a species of flowering plant endemic to the US state of Florida, where it is only known from Miami-Dade and Monroe counties.

== Habitat ==
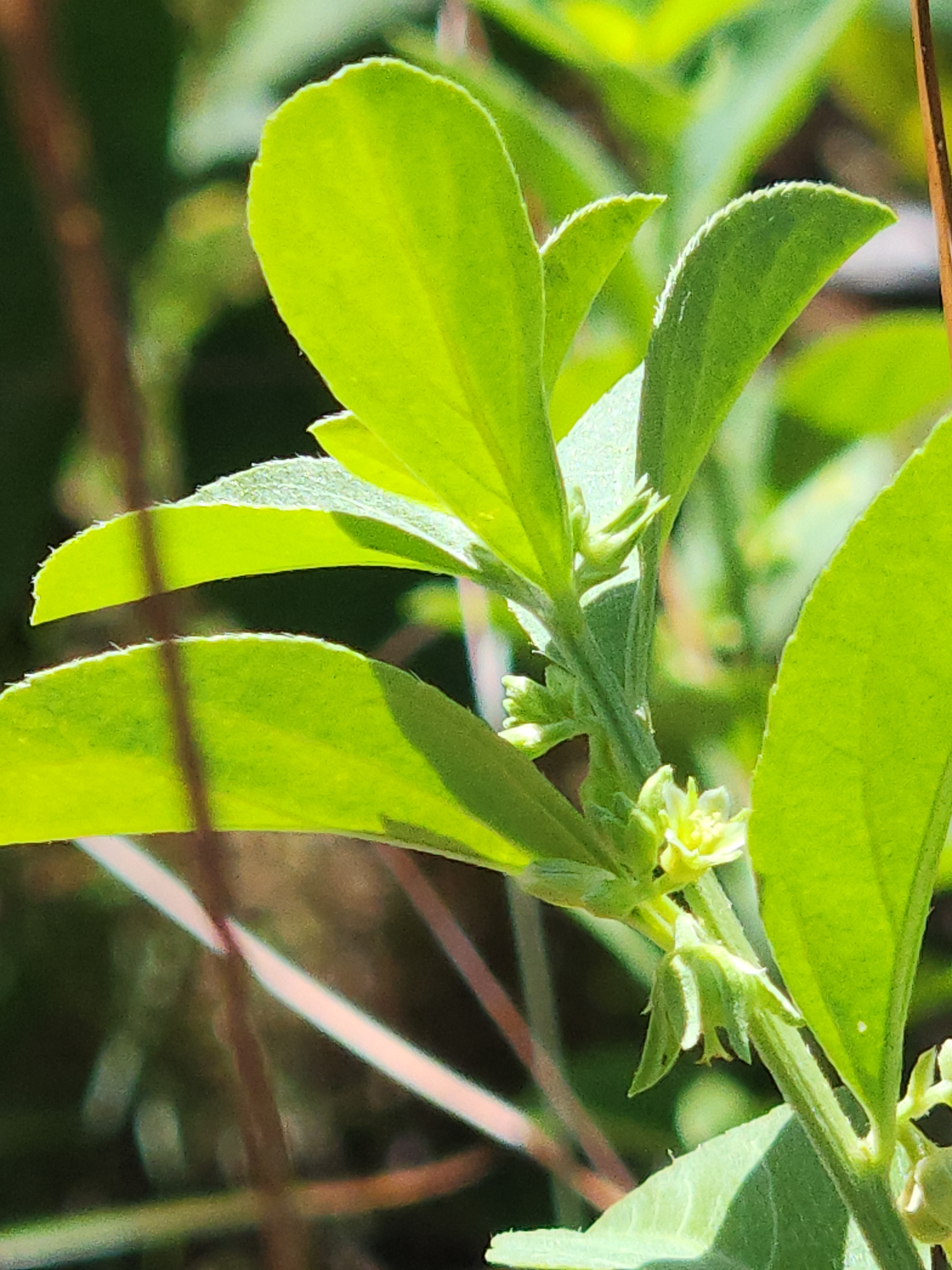
Close-up of bloom

This species is only known from south Florida's open canopy fire-dependent pine rockland habitat.

== Conservation ==
The species faces many threats due to the historic devastation of the pine rockland habitat it relies on (of which only roughly 6% remains) with it now being known from likely less than 18 sites. Two sites in particular are known to support relatively large, stable, and protected populations: Long Pine Key in Everglades National Park and Big Pine Key in National Key Deer Refuge. In total, there are an estimated less than 10,000 total plants in existence. Ongoing threats include fire suppression and invasive species, both of which are threats even on protected lands.

== Taxonomy ==
This species is the subject of ongoing taxonomic work. It has historically been lumped in under Argythamnia argothamnoides, a related and morphologically similar taxa found in northern South America. However, the considerably disjunct nature of the Florida material has led researchers to tentatively split A. blodgettii out as a distinct entity.
