= Hymenocallis puntagordensis =

Conservation status
- Critically Imperiled (NatureServe)

Scientific classification
- Kingdom: Plantae
- Clade: Embryophytes
- Clade: Tracheophytes
- Clade: Spermatophytes
- Clade: Angiosperms
- Clade: Monocots
- Order: Asparagales
- Family: Amaryllidaceae
- Subfamily: Amaryllidoideae
- Genus: Hymenocallis
- Species: H. puntagordensis

Binomial name
- Hymenocallis puntagordensis Traub

Synonyms
- Hymenocallis latifolia var. puntagordensis (Traub) D. B. Ward

Species of flowering plant

Hymenocallis puntagordensis the smallcup spiderlily or Punta Gorda spiderlily, is a plant in the Amaryllidaceae. It is a rare and little known endemic known only from the vicinity of Punta Gorda, in Charlotte County, Florida. This is on the Gulf coast just north of Fort Myers. The species is listed as "critically imperiled."

Hymenocallis puntagordensis is a bulb-forming perennial found on roadsides and in disturbed pine woodlands. It is similar to H. latifolia, differing in having narrower, coriaceous leaves and a staminal corona with prominently lacerate margins.
