= Xyris correlliorum =

Conservation status
- Critically Imperiled (NatureServe)

Scientific classification
- Kingdom: Plantae
- Clade: Tracheophytes
- Clade: Angiosperms
- Clade: Monocots
- Clade: Commelinids
- Order: Poales
- Family: Xyridaceae
- Genus: Xyris
- Species: X. correlliorum

Binomial name
- Xyris correlliorum E.L.Bridges & Orzell

Species of flowering plant

Xyris correlliorum, commonly referred to as Correll's yelloweyed grass, is a rare species of flowering plant endemic to the US state of Florida, where it is only known from the southernmost part of the Lake Wales Ridge in Highlands County.

== Habitat ==
It is an emergent aquatic perennial that can be found along lakeshores and floating mats on some lakes on the extreme southern end of the ridge.

== Conservation ==
The species, due to its highly restricted range, is threatened primarily due to habitat loss to development for real estate and agriculture. The species is historically known from only three lakes: Lake Placid, Lake Annie (on Archbold Biological Station, and Grassy Lake. The Grassy Lake and Lake Placid occurrences are known from 1996 vouchers, but little of the Grassy Lake's natural shoreline now exists, so it is possibly extirpated. Similarly, the Lake Placid occurrence has not been relocated.
