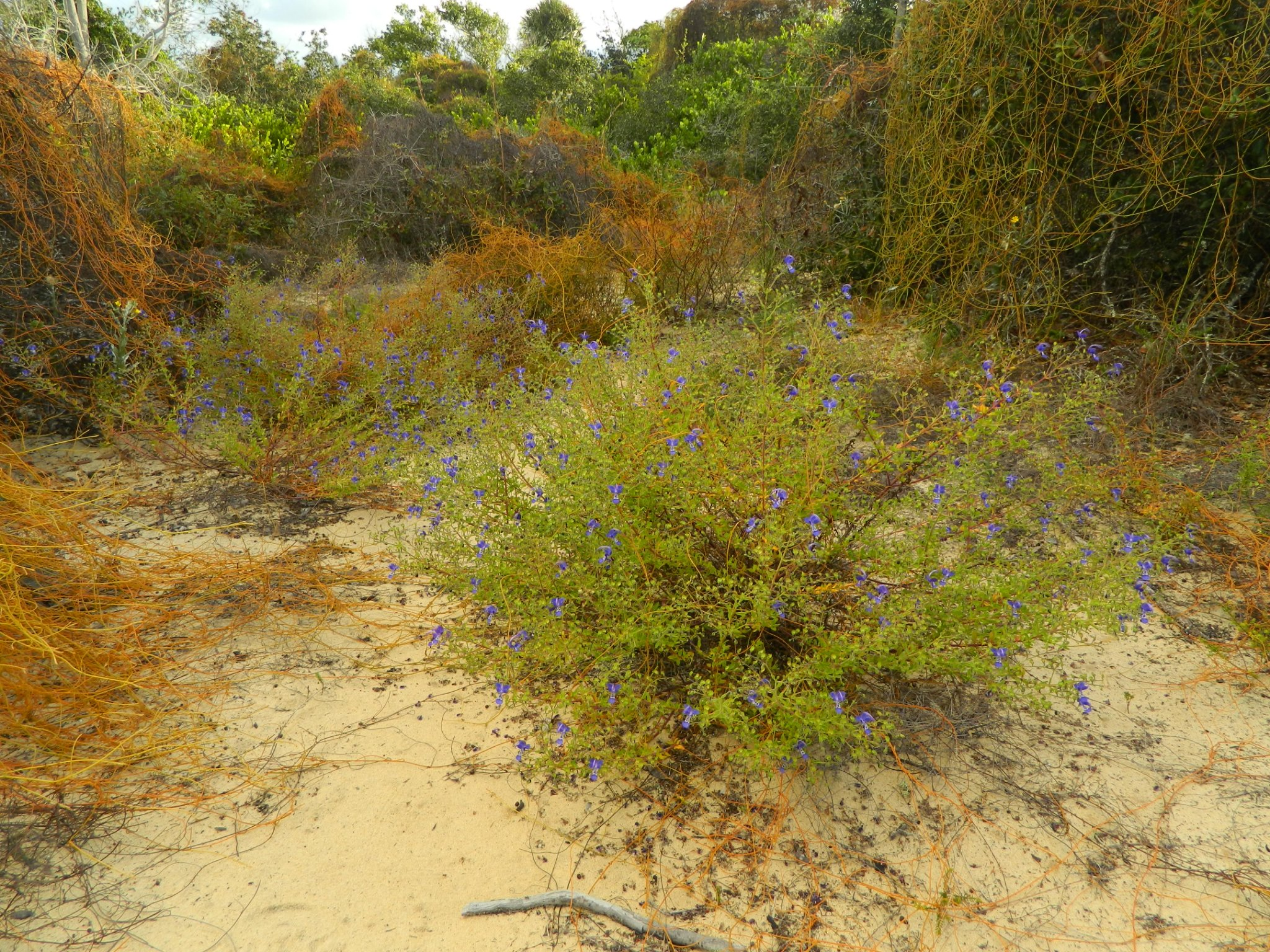

Conservation status
- Imperiled (NatureServe)

Scientific classification
- Kingdom: Plantae
- Clade: Tracheophytes
- Clade: Angiosperms
- Clade: Eudicots
- Clade: Asterids
- Order: Lamiales
- Family: Lamiaceae
- Genus: Trichostema
- Species: T. hobe

Binomial name
- Trichostema hobe K.S.McClell.

= Trichostema hobe =

Species of plant

Trichostema hobe, commonly known as Jobé Bluecurls or Hobe Mountain Bluecurls, is a species of flowering plant in the mint family (Lamiaceae). It is endemic to Florida in the southeastern United States.

== Description ==
Trichostema hobe is a perennial herb with opposite leaves and bilaterally symmetrical flowers typical of the mint family. As in other species of Trichostema, the flowers are borne in axillary clusters and exhibit elongated stamens adapted for insect pollination. Detailed morphological descriptions are provided in regional floras and taxonomic treatments of the genus.

== Distribution and habitat ==
The species is endemic to Florida and is known only from Martin County. It inhabits sandy openings in Florida scrub along the Jupiter Ridge.

== Conservation ==
Trichostema hobe is listed as G2 and S2 (Imperiled) by NatureServe. Given the risks associated to existing populations, its small native range, and its small number of extant populations, the Center for Biological Diversity and Kevan Schoonover McClelland submitted a petition to the US Fish and Wildlife Service to add this species to the endangered species list in December of 2024.
