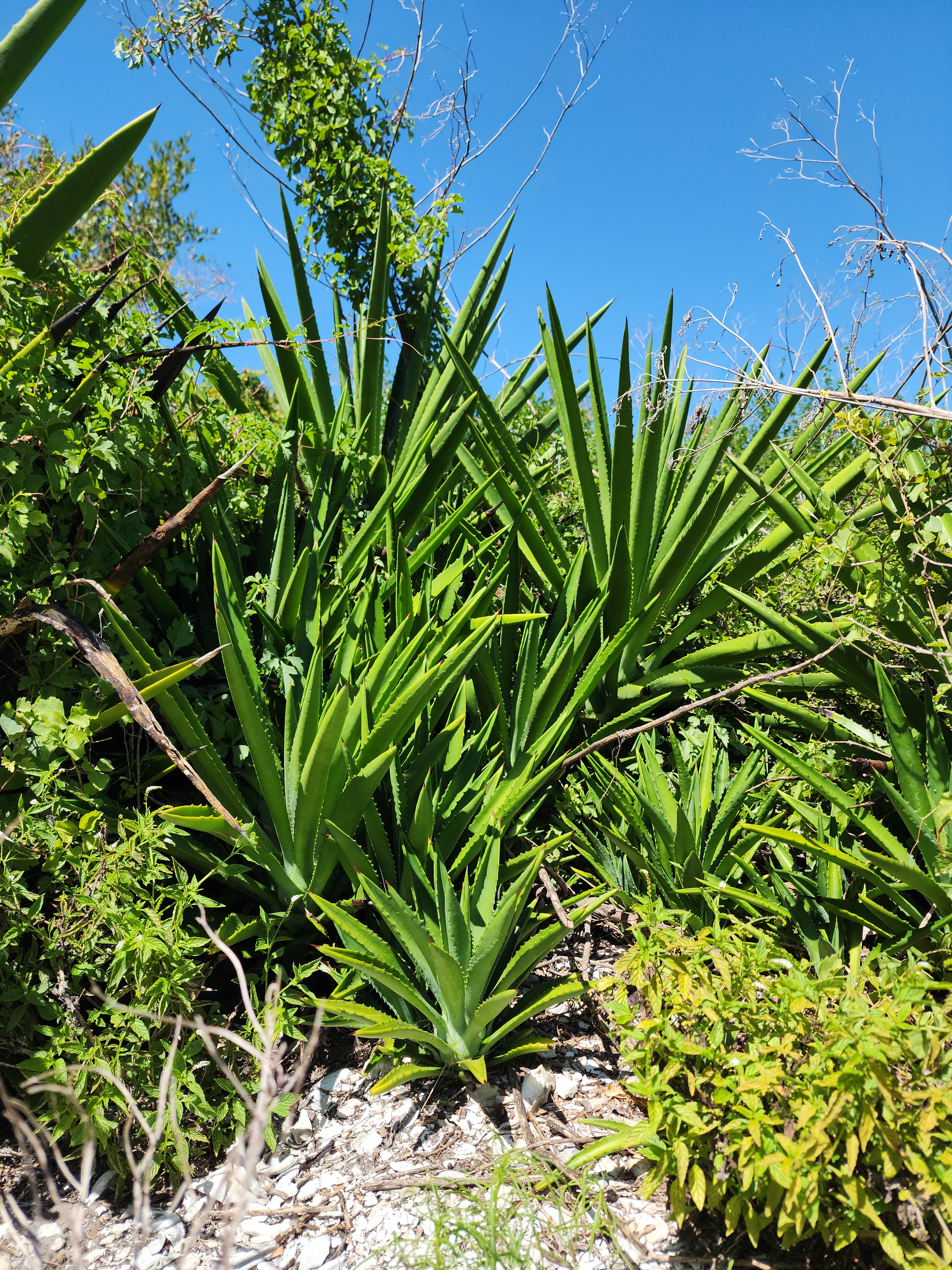
- Growing on shell midden in coastal Manatee County, FL

Conservation status
- Vulnerable (IUCN 3.1)

- Vulnerable (NatureServe)

Scientific classification
- Kingdom: Plantae
- Clade: Embryophytes
- Clade: Tracheophytes
- Clade: Angiosperms
- Clade: Monocots
- Order: Asparagales
- Family: Asparagaceae
- Subfamily: Agavoideae
- Genus: Agave
- Species: A. decipiens

Binomial name
- Agave decipiens J.G.Baker

Synonyms
- Agave laxifolia J.G.Baker

= Agave decipiens =

Species of flowering plant

Agave decipiens, common names false Sisal or Florida agave, is a plant species endemic to coastal Florida in the United States.

== Description ==
Agave decipiens is an arborescent (tree-like) species with a trunk up to 4 m tall, frequently producing suckers (vegetative offshoots). Leaves are frequently 100 cm long, though some of twice that length have been recorded. Leaves have wavy margins with teeth. Flowering stalks are up to 5 m tall, with a large panicle of greenish-yellow flowers. Fruit is a dry capsule up to 5 cm long.

== Taxonomy ==
Some authors have suggested that material from Central America and from the Yucatán Peninsula in Mexico might be of the same species as A. decipiens. Gentry and Zona, however, discounted this possibility, regarding this non-Floridian material as A. vivipara (= A. angustifolia)

== Distribution and habitat ==
Agave decipiens is endemic to southern peninsular Florida, where it grows on shell middens, maritime hammocks, rockland hammocks, and coastal rock barrens. It also grows on hummocks in the Everglades and other marshy areas very close to sea level. It is cultivated as an ornamental in other regions. The species is reported naturalized in Spain, India, Pakistan, and South Africa.

== Conservation ==
Being found natively in coastal uplands in southern peninsular Florida, this species faces a variety of threats stemming from this degree of rather narrow endemism. Its primary threat is habitat loss as these landscapes it calls home have been destroyed for commercial and residential development. Additional threats to its long-term survival include sea level rise, storm surge, and out-competition from infestations of invasive plants.
