= Harrisia simpsonii =

Conservation status
- Imperiled (NatureServe)

Scientific classification
- Kingdom: Plantae
- Clade: Tracheophytes
- Clade: Angiosperms
- Clade: Eudicots
- Order: Caryophyllales
- Family: Cactaceae
- Subfamily: Cactoideae
- Genus: Harrisia
- Species: H. simpsonii

Binomial name
- Harrisia simpsonii Small ex Britton & Rose

Species of cactus

Harrisia simpsonii, or Simpson's applecactus, is a species of cactus in the Trichocereeae tribe.

It grows in the state of Florida, in the Southeastern United States. It may be found growing on shell mounds, mangrove swamps or on high hammocks, and may be associated with buttonwood (Conocarpus erectus). It is threatened by collecting for horticulture.
