= Hypericum lissophloeus =

Scientific classification
- Kingdom: Plantae
- Clade: Tracheophytes
- Clade: Angiosperms
- Clade: Eudicots
- Clade: Rosids
- Order: Malpighiales
- Family: Hypericaceae
- Genus: Hypericum
- Species: H. lissophloeus

Binomial name
- Hypericum lissophloeus P.B.Adams

Species of plant

Hypericum lissophloeus, the smoothbark St. Johnswort, is a species of flowering plant in the family Hypericaceae. It is native to the Florida Panhandle. An erect perennial shrub reaching 12 ft (4 m), it grows on the edges of sink hole ponds and is adapted to survive widely varying water levels over the course of the year, from near drowning to drought.
