= Digitaria floridana =

Conservation status
- Critically Imperiled (NatureServe)

Scientific classification
- Kingdom: Plantae
- Clade: Tracheophytes
- Clade: Angiosperms
- Clade: Monocots
- Clade: Commelinids
- Order: Poales
- Family: Poaceae
- Subfamily: Panicoideae
- Genus: Digitaria
- Species: D. floridana

Binomial name
- Digitaria floridana Hitchc.

Species of flowering plant

Digitaria floridana, commonly referred to as Florida crabgrass, is a rare species of crabgrass endemic to north-central peninsular Florida in the US.

== Habitat ==
It is known to grow in longleaf pine sandhill and sandy mesic hammocks. The species is believed to be an obligate heliophyte, requiring full sun exposure to persist. As such, it may disappear from fire-suppressed landscapes.

== Conservation ==
It is only known from Marion, Hernando, and possibly Citrus counties. It has been documented in Silver River State Park in Marion and a plant nursery in Hernando.

There isn't much information available on this species, and conservation efforts should include relocating it in known sites and searching for previously unknown populations where suitable habitat remains.
