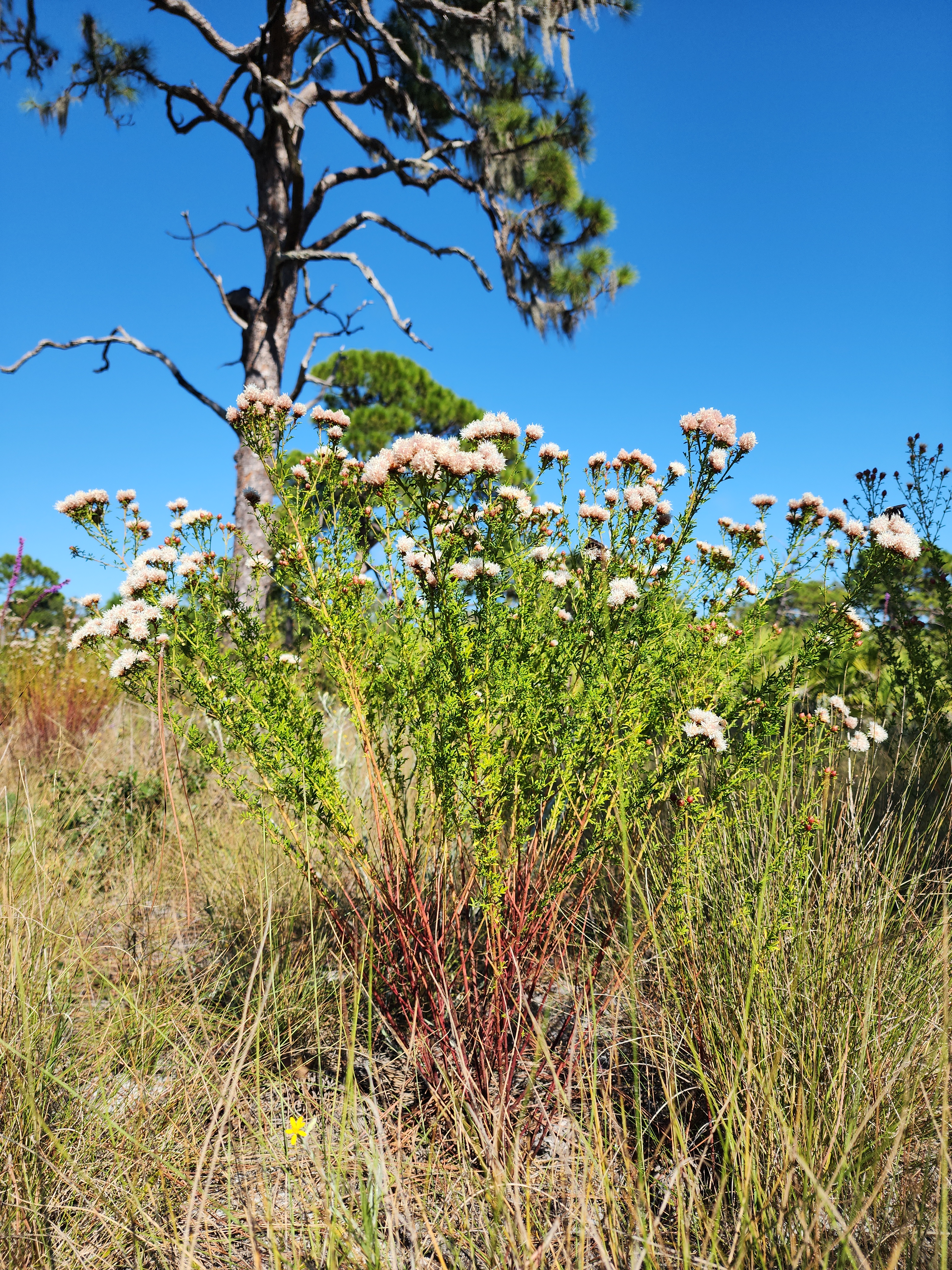
- Blooming in scrubby flatwood habitat

Conservation status
- Imperiled (NatureServe)

Scientific classification
- Kingdom: Plantae
- Clade: Tracheophytes
- Clade: Angiosperms
- Clade: Eudicots
- Clade: Rosids
- Order: Fabales
- Family: Fabaceae
- Subfamily: Faboideae
- Genus: Dalea
- Species: D. adenopoda

Binomial name
- Dalea adenopoda (Rydberg) Isely

= Dalea adenopoda =

Species of flowering plant

Dalea adenopoda, commonly referred to as Tampa prairie-clover or Summer farewell, is a rare species of flowering plant endemic to central and southern peninsular Florida, USA.

== Description ==
D. adenopoda is a perennial upright shrub in the family Fabaceae that may reach up to 3 feet tall.

The flowers are born in terminal heads. The flower buds are concealed by red ovate bracts. Each flower head consists of up to 30 white to pinkish-white flowers. The fruit is a pod about 2.5 mm long.

The alternate leaves are small and fascicled, less than 2 cm long with 3-7 elliptical leaflets, usually 2-3 mm wide and 6-8 mm long. They are pale green and often involute.

D. adenopoda can often be mistaken for another species, D. pinnata, which is found throughout North and Central Florida and has a similar inflorescence. The two species can be distinguished by the shape of their leaflets. D. pinnata leaflets are linear, while D. adenopoda has leaflets that are elliptical.

== Distribution and Habitat ==
D. adenopoda is a Florida endemic. Its range, as identified by vouchered specimens, extends from Lake County in the north to Collier County in the south.

It is limited to the well-drained, sandy substrates of Central and South Florida; namely scrub, scrubby flatwoods, and longleaf pine sandhill. It is often associated with turkey oak, long-leaf pine, and saw palmetto.

== Gallery ==

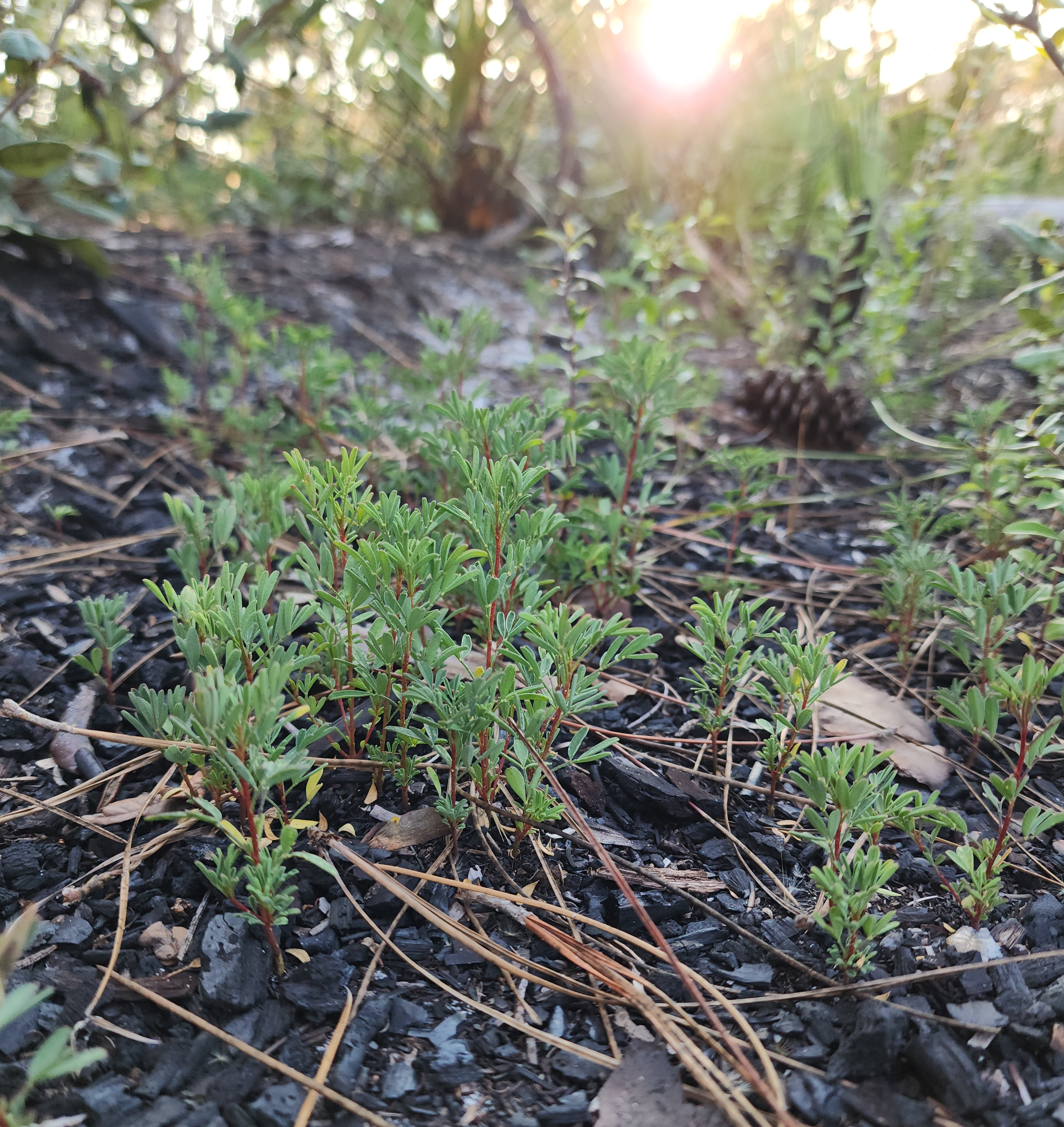
Sprouting after midsummer prescribed burn
