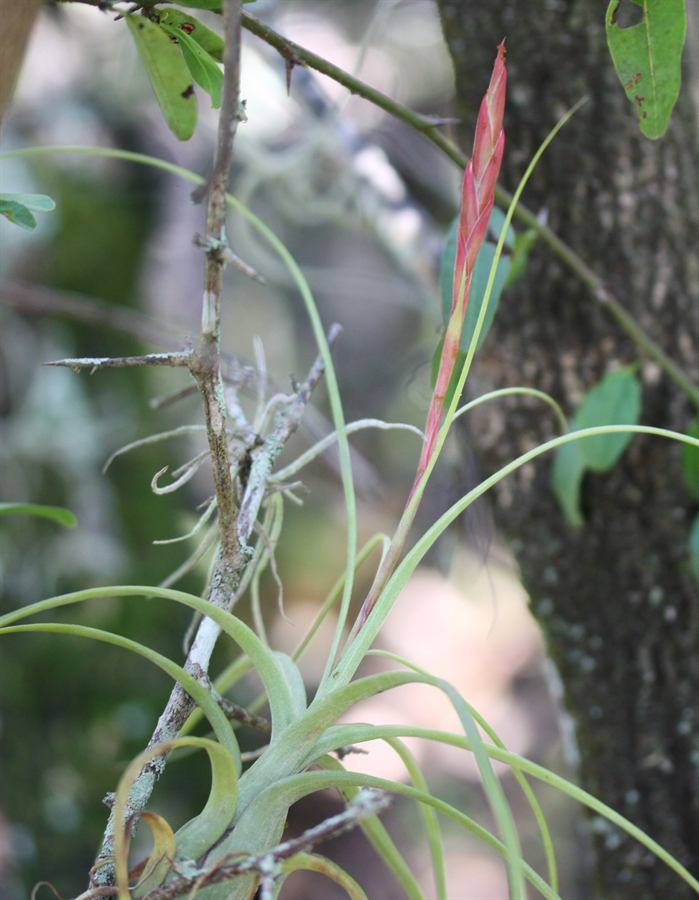

Scientific classification
- Kingdom: Plantae
- Clade: Tracheophytes
- Clade: Angiosperms
- Clade: Monocots
- Clade: Commelinids
- Order: Poales
- Family: Bromeliaceae
- Genus: Tillandsia
- Subgenus: Tillandsia subg. Tillandsia
- Species: T. balbisiana

Binomial name
- Tillandsia balbisiana Schult. & Schult.f.

Synonyms
- Platystachys digitata Beer; Tillandsia urbaniana Wittm.; Tillandsia cubensis Gand.; Tillandsia dressleri L.B.Sm.

= Tillandsia balbisiana =

Species of epiphyte

Tillandsia balbisiana, common name northern needleleaf, is a species of bromeliad in the genus Tillandsia. This species in native to Mexico, Central America, Colombia, Venezuela, the West Indies, and Florida.

== Cultivars ==
- Tillandsia 'Dura Flor'
- Tillandsia 'Florida'
- Tillandsia 'Polly Ellen'
- Tillandsia 'Red Fountain'
- Tillandsia 'Royale'
- Tillandsia 'Timm'
