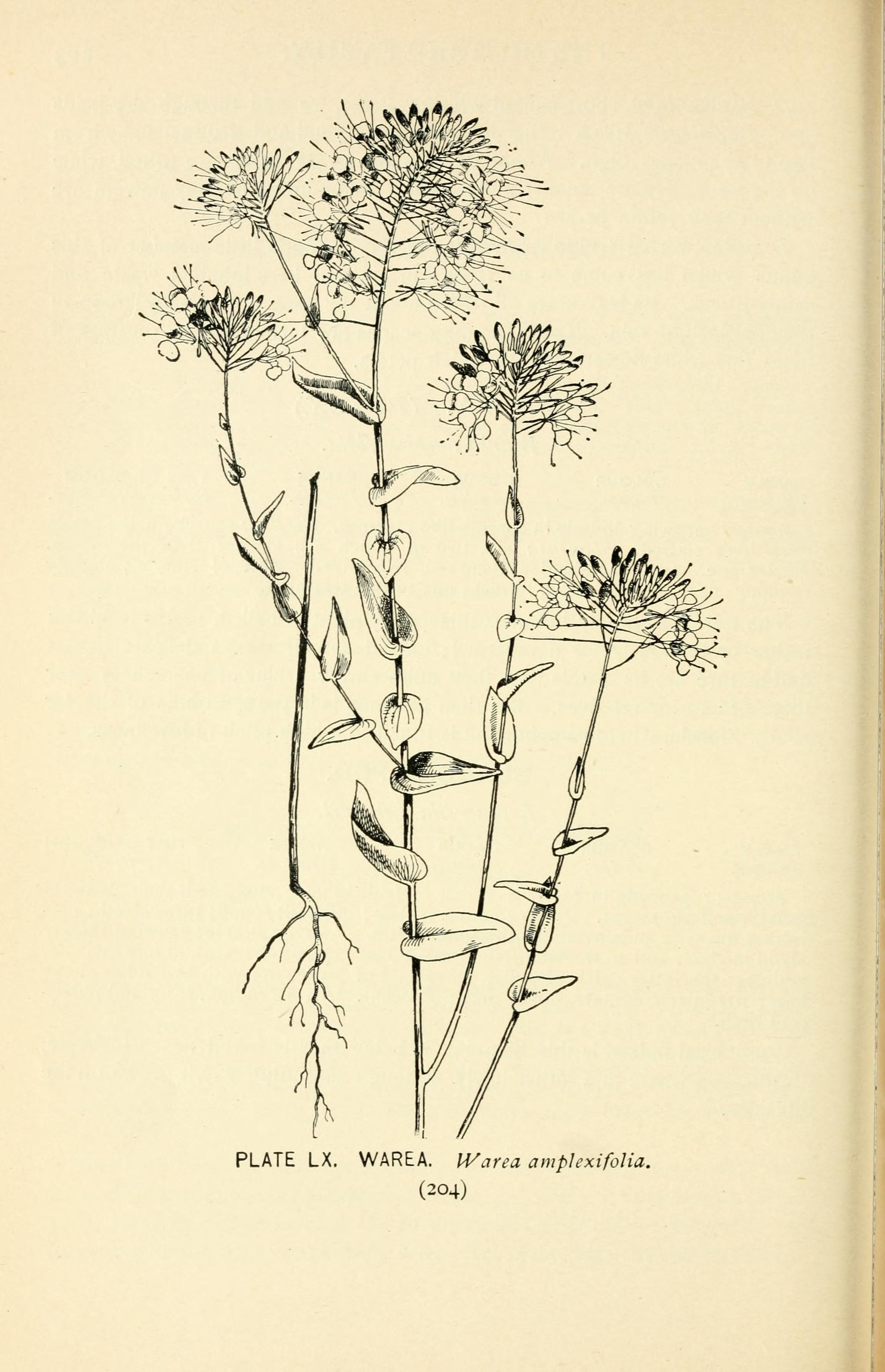
- Illustration of Warea amplexifolia

Scientific classification
- Kingdom: Plantae
- Clade: Tracheophytes
- Clade: Angiosperms
- Clade: Eudicots
- Clade: Rosids
- Order: Brassicales
- Family: Brassicaceae
- Genus: Warea; Nutt.

Species
- Warea amplexifolia (Nutt.) Nutt.; Warea carteri Small; Warea cuneifolia (Muhl. ex Nutt.) Nutt.; Warea sessilifolia Nash

= Warea (plant) =

Genus of flowering plants

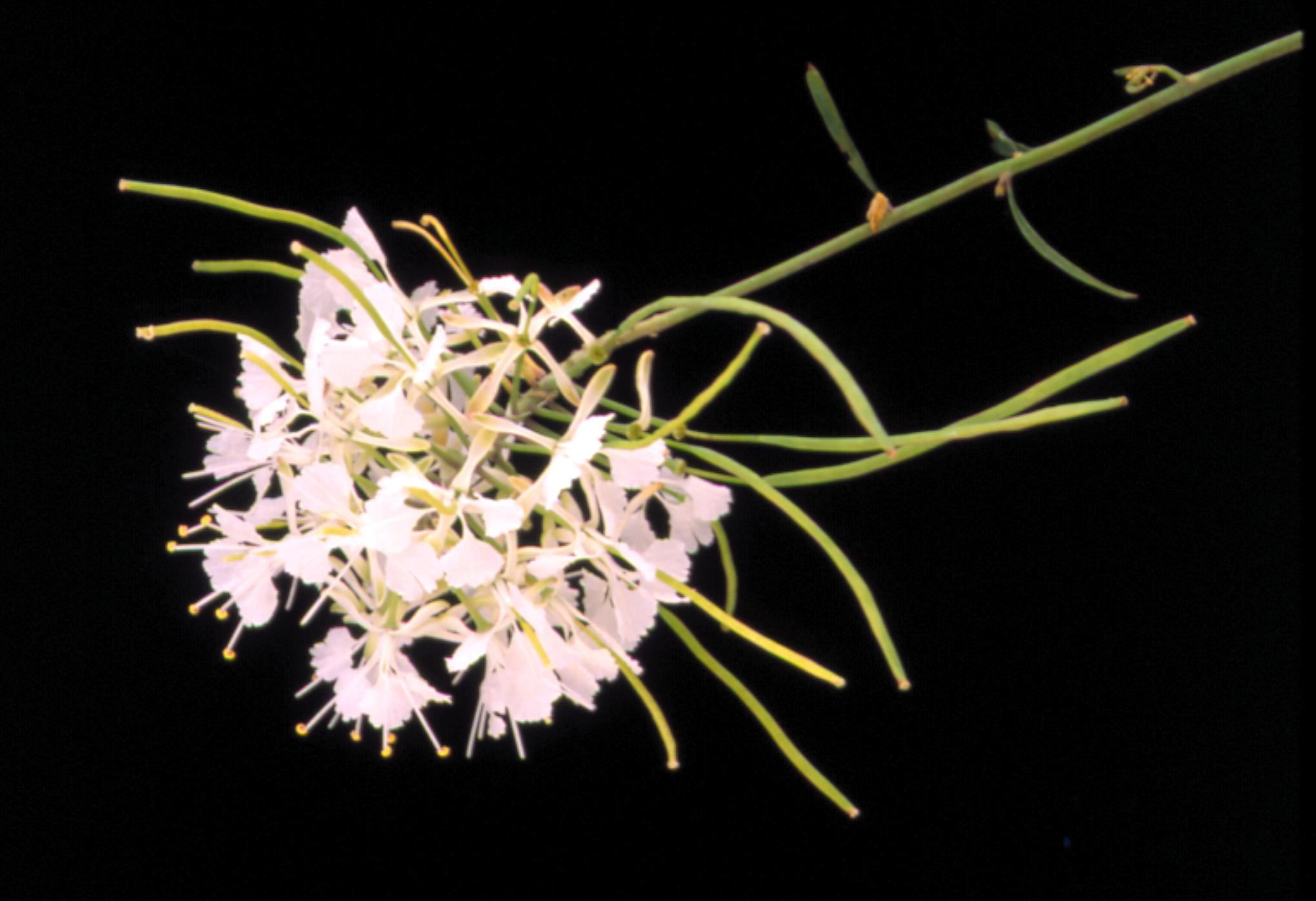
Warea carteri

Warea is a genus of flowering plants in the family Brassicaceae. It includes four species native to the southeastern United States – Alabama, Florida, Georgia, North Carolina, and South Carolina.

== Species ==
Four species are accepted.

- Warea amplexifolia (Nutt.) Nutt.
- Warea carteri Small
- Warea cuneifolia (Muhl. ex Nutt.) Nutt.
- Warea sessilifolia Nash
