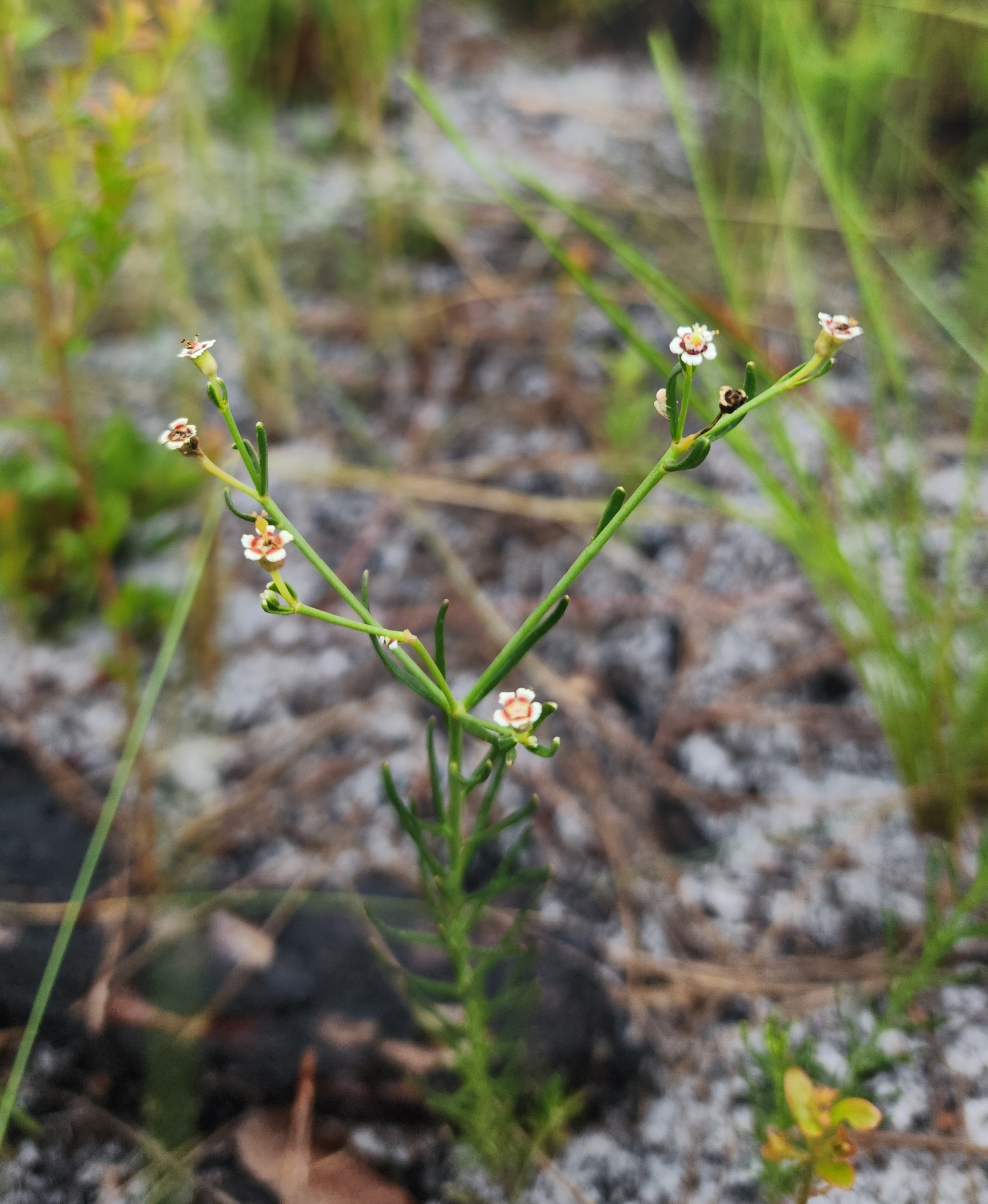
- Blooming in recently-burned scrub

Conservation status
- Apparently Secure (NatureServe)

Scientific classification
- Kingdom: Plantae
- Clade: Tracheophytes
- Clade: Angiosperms
- Clade: Eudicots
- Clade: Rosids
- Order: Malpighiales
- Family: Euphorbiaceae
- Genus: Euphorbia
- Species: E. polyphylla

Binomial name
- Euphorbia polyphylla Engelm. ex Chapm.

= Euphorbia polyphylla =

Species of flowering plant

Euphorbia polyphylla, commonly referred to as lesser Florida spurge, is a species of flowering plant endemic to peninsular Florida, USA.

== Habitat ==
It only occurs in the fire-dependent habitats of the central and southern peninsula, including in Florida scrub, longleaf pine sandhill, dry flatwoods, and pine rockland.
