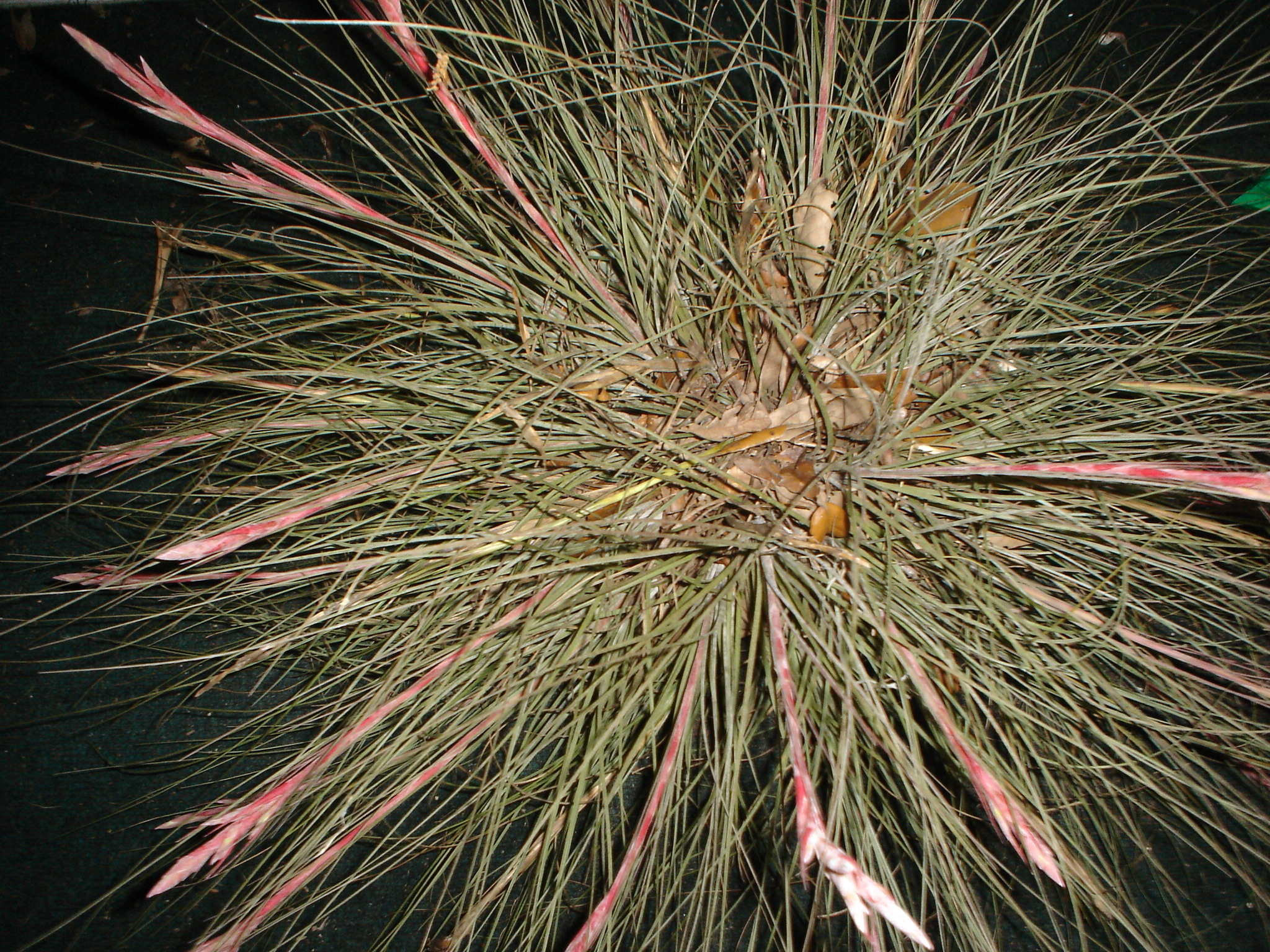

Scientific classification
- Kingdom: Plantae
- Clade: Tracheophytes
- Clade: Angiosperms
- Clade: Monocots
- Clade: Commelinids
- Order: Poales
- Family: Bromeliaceae
- Genus: Tillandsia
- Subgenus: Tillandsia subg. Tillandsia
- Species: T. bartramii

Binomial name
- Tillandsia bartramii Elliot

Synonyms
- Tillandsia pinifolia Leconte; Tillandsia myriophylla Small

= Tillandsia bartramii =

Species of flowering plant

Tillandsia bartramii, commonly known as Bartram's airplant, is a species of flowering plant in the bromeliad family. It is native to Florida, South Carolina and southern Georgia in the United States as well as Guatemala and Mexico (Tamaulipas, Oaxaca, Guerrero, Jalisco, San Luis Potosí). The name honours William Bartram (1739–1823), an early Florida naturalist.

== Description ==
Plants form clumps 20–40 cm (8–16 inches) in diameter. There are 15–30 gray leaves, which measure 15–40 × 0.2–0.5 cm (6–16 × 0.08–0.20 inches). Inflorescences are 8–15 cm (3.2–6.0 inches) in length, 2–4 mm (0.08–0.16 inches) in diameter, and have 5–20 flowers. Spikes measure 2–4 × 1 cm (0.8–1.6 × 0.4 inches), while floral bracts are 1.4–1.7 cm (0.45–0.68 inches) in length. Fruits measure 2.5–3 cm (1.0–1.2 inches) in diameter.
