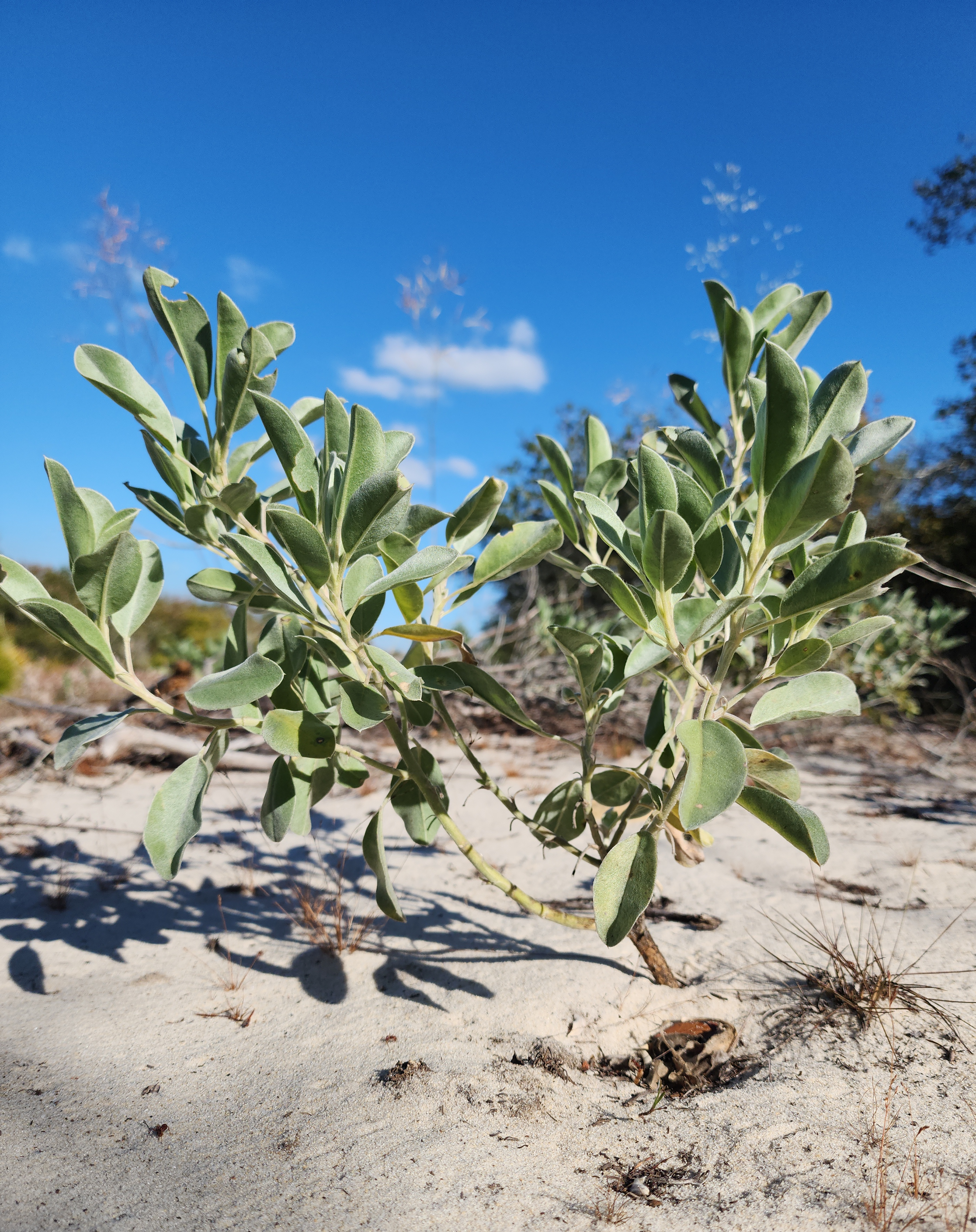
- Growing in xeric sandhill habitat

Conservation status
- Unranked (NatureServe)

Scientific classification
- Kingdom: Plantae
- Clade: Tracheophytes
- Clade: Angiosperms
- Clade: Eudicots
- Clade: Rosids
- Order: Fabales
- Family: Fabaceae
- Subfamily: Faboideae
- Genus: Lupinus
- Species: L. cumulicola

Binomial name
- Lupinus cumulicola Small

= Lupinus cumulicola =

Species of flowering plant

Lupinus cumulicola, commonly referred to as sky-blue lupine, is a species of flowering plant endemic to the Lake Wales Ridge in the US state of Florida.

== Habitat ==
It is native to the sandy, fire-dependent habitats of the ridge, primarily longleaf pine sandhill and scrub. However, it is capable of persisting in degraded habitats such as rangeland and roadsides, provided the frequency of disturbance is not too high.

== Taxonomy ==
The lupine taxa of Florida have, as of 2024, been undergoing intensive reassessment. Lupinus cumulicola was, until recently, included under Lupinus diffusus which covered all Florida populations. However, recent work has shown that Lupinus cumulicola should be regarded as a separate species specific to peninsular Florida.

On the basis of morphology and biogeography, Bridges & Orzell treat Lupinus cumulicola as one of four species endemic to peninsular Florida alongside the newly described Lupinus pilosior, Lupinus ocalensis, and Lupinus floridanus, with their origin representing a relatively recent speciation event.
