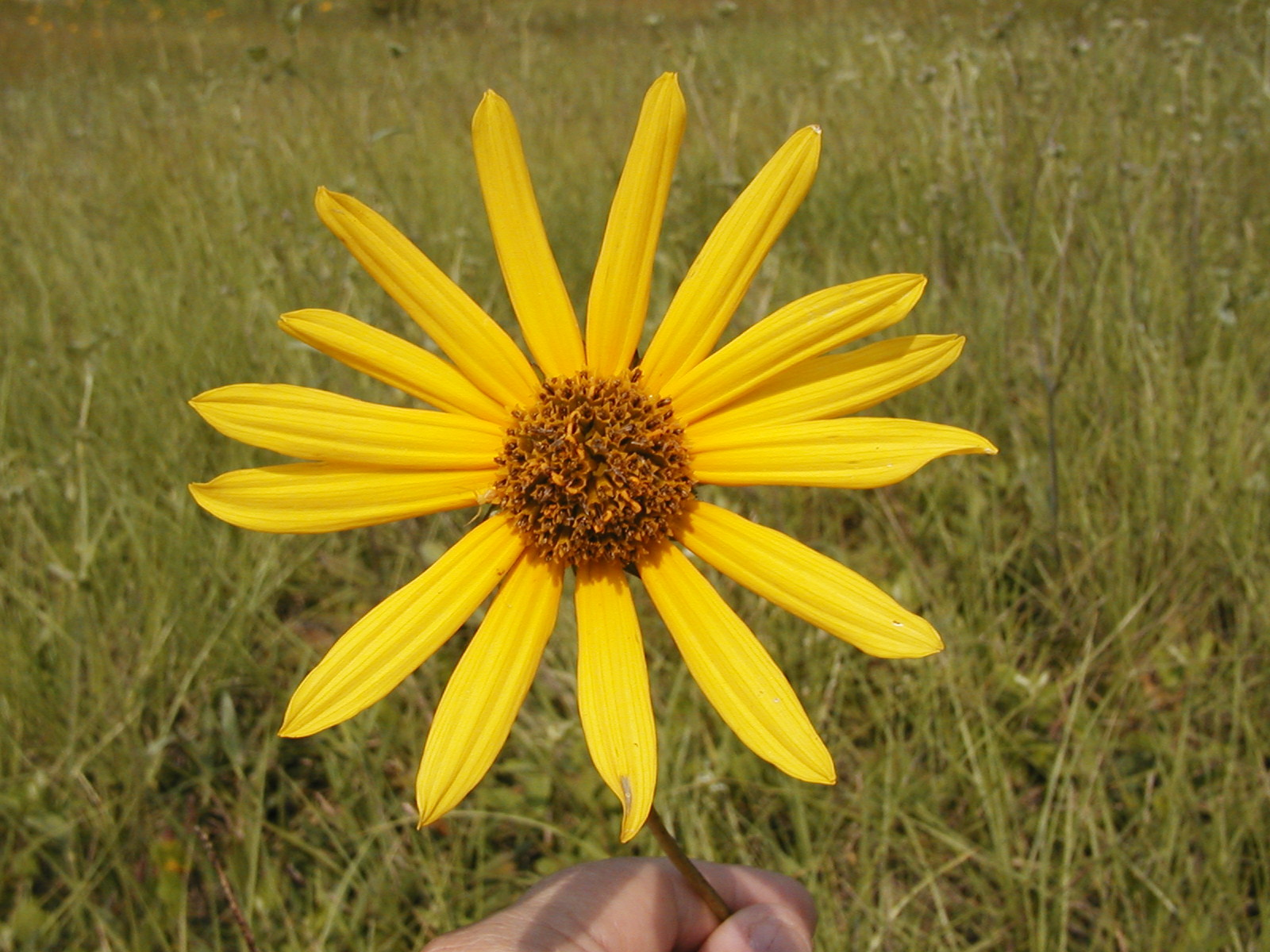

Scientific classification
- Kingdom: Plantae
- Clade: Tracheophytes
- Clade: Angiosperms
- Clade: Eudicots
- Clade: Asterids
- Order: Asterales
- Family: Asteraceae
- Tribe: Heliantheae
- Genus: Helianthus
- Species: H. carnosus

Binomial name
- Helianthus carnosus Small

= Helianthus carnosus =

Species of sunflower

Helianthus carnosus is a rare North American species of sunflower known by the common names lakeside sunflower and flatwoods sunflower. It is found only in the northeastern part of the state of Florida in the United States.

Helianthus carnosus is a perennial herb up to 60 cm (2 feet) tall. Most of the leaves are close to the base of the stem, each leaf hairless, evergreen, up to 25 cm (10 inches) long. There are only a few small leaves on the stem, the only species in Florida with that characteristic. One plant usually produces only one flower head, rarely 2 or 3. Each head has with 12-17 yellow ray florets surrounding 100 or more yellow disc florets. The plant grows in wet sites in prairies in coastal beach sands at low elevations.
