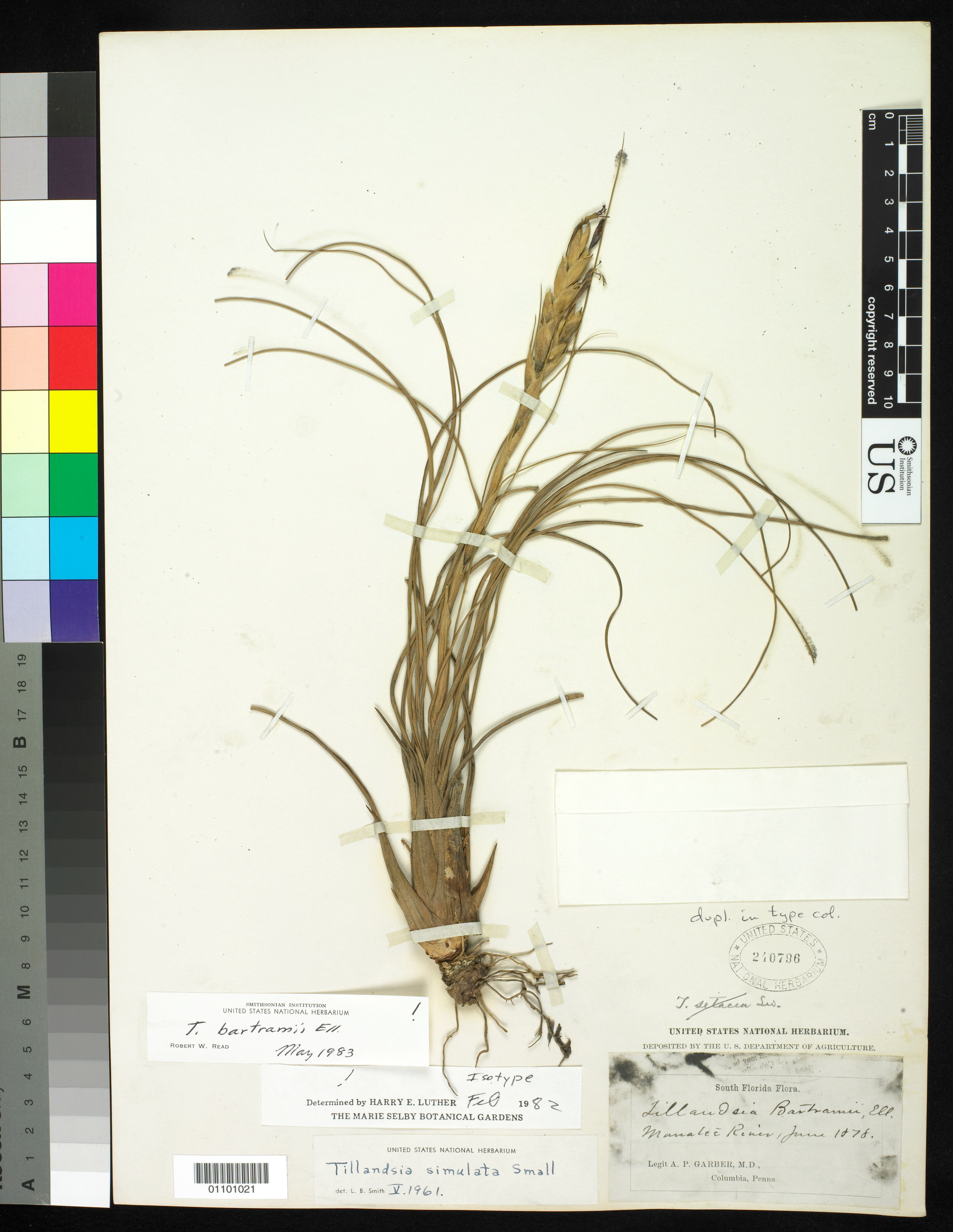

Scientific classification
- Kingdom: Plantae
- Clade: Tracheophytes
- Clade: Angiosperms
- Clade: Monocots
- Clade: Commelinids
- Order: Poales
- Family: Bromeliaceae
- Genus: Tillandsia
- Subgenus: Tillandsia subg. Tillandsia
- Species: T. simulata

Binomial name
- Tillandsia simulata Small

= Tillandsia simulata =

Species of plant

Tillandsia simulata, common name Florida airplant or Manatee River airplant, is a plant species endemic to Florida. It an epiphyte growing on the branches of various trees and shrubs in the region, mostly in swamps and other moist locations.

Tillandsia simulata can be distinguished by its narrowly elliptic leaf sheath, up to 2 cm wide. It produces inflorescences up to 15 cm (6 inches) long, with rose-colored bracts and conspicuous violet flowers.
