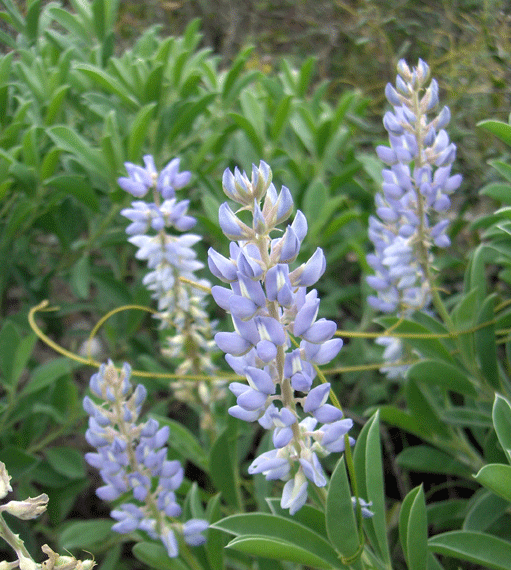

Scientific classification
- Kingdom: Plantae
- Clade: Tracheophytes
- Clade: Angiosperms
- Clade: Eudicots
- Clade: Rosids
- Order: Fabales
- Family: Fabaceae
- Subfamily: Faboideae
- Genus: Lupinus
- Subgenus: Lupinus subg. Platycarpos
- Species: L. diffusus

Binomial name
- Lupinus diffusus Nutt.

= Lupinus diffusus =

Species of legume

Lupinus diffusus, commonly known as Oak Ridge lupine, spreading lupine, or sky-blue lupine, is a species of lupine native to the southeastern United States, from North Carolina south to Florida and west to Mississippi. It is restricted to very dry, sandy soils, often in open pine or oak woodlands.

It is a perennial herbaceous plant growing to 30–50 centimetres (12–20 in) tall. The leaves are palmately compound with 3-5 leaflets 6–12 centimetres (2.4–4.7 in) long and 3–5 centimetres (1.2–2.0 in) broad, gray-green to silvery green, covered with fine white hairs. The flowers are pale blue or violet, produced in a dense spike 15–30 centimetres (5.9–11.8 in) long.

== Cultivation ==
It is grown as an ornamental plant in gardens for its flowers and silvery leaves, produced in early spring.

== References and external links ==
- NRCS. "Lupinus diffusus". PLANTS Database. United States Department of Agriculture (USDA).
- "Lupinus diffusus". Germplasm Resources Information Network. Agricultural Research Service, United States Department of Agriculture.
- Photos of Lupinus diffusus
