= Opuntia ammophila =

Conservation status
- Least Concern (IUCN 3.1)

Scientific classification
- Kingdom: Plantae
- Clade: Tracheophytes
- Clade: Angiosperms
- Clade: Eudicots
- Order: Caryophyllales
- Family: Cactaceae
- Genus: Opuntia
- Species: O. ammophila

Binomial name
- Opuntia ammophila Small

Species of cactus

Opuntia ammophila, the devil's-tongue, is a species of prickly pear cactus in Florida. Individuals typically occur singly and do not generally form dense thickets. O. ammophila was once considered a variety of O. humifusa; however, it is a distinct species. Among their many differences, O. ammophila has gray-green cladodes rather than green or grass-green.

== Description ==
Opuntia ammophila can grow to the height of humans, and large plants with thick trunks were encountered 100 years ago. However, now it is unusual to find plants that are even 1 m tall. However, even small plants form a single trunk. The flower buds are distinct with recurved tepals, and the flowers themselves are light-yellow with cream-colored stigmas. The plant is infrequently encountered in mid-Florida.
