= Solidago correllii =

Scientific classification
- Kingdom: Plantae
- Clade: Tracheophytes
- Clade: Angiosperms
- Clade: Eudicots
- Clade: Asterids
- Order: Asterales
- Family: Asteraceae
- Genus: Solidago
- Species: S. correllii

Binomial name
- Solidago correllii Semple

Species of flowering plant

Solidago correllii, commonly known as the Guadalupe Mountains goldenrod, is a relatively recently described species of goldenrod found in the Guadalupe Mountains of Texas and New Mexico. Guadalupe Mountains goldenrod was once thought to be a subspecies of Solidago wrightii, which it is similar in appearance to, but recent genetic and morphological evidence has led to its recognition as a unique species.

== Distribution and habitat ==
Guadalupe Mountains goldenrod is only found in the Guadalupe Mountains in Chaves County, New Mexico, Eddy County, New Mexico, and Culberson County, Texas at elevations of 4,300–7,100 ft (1,300–2,200 m).
