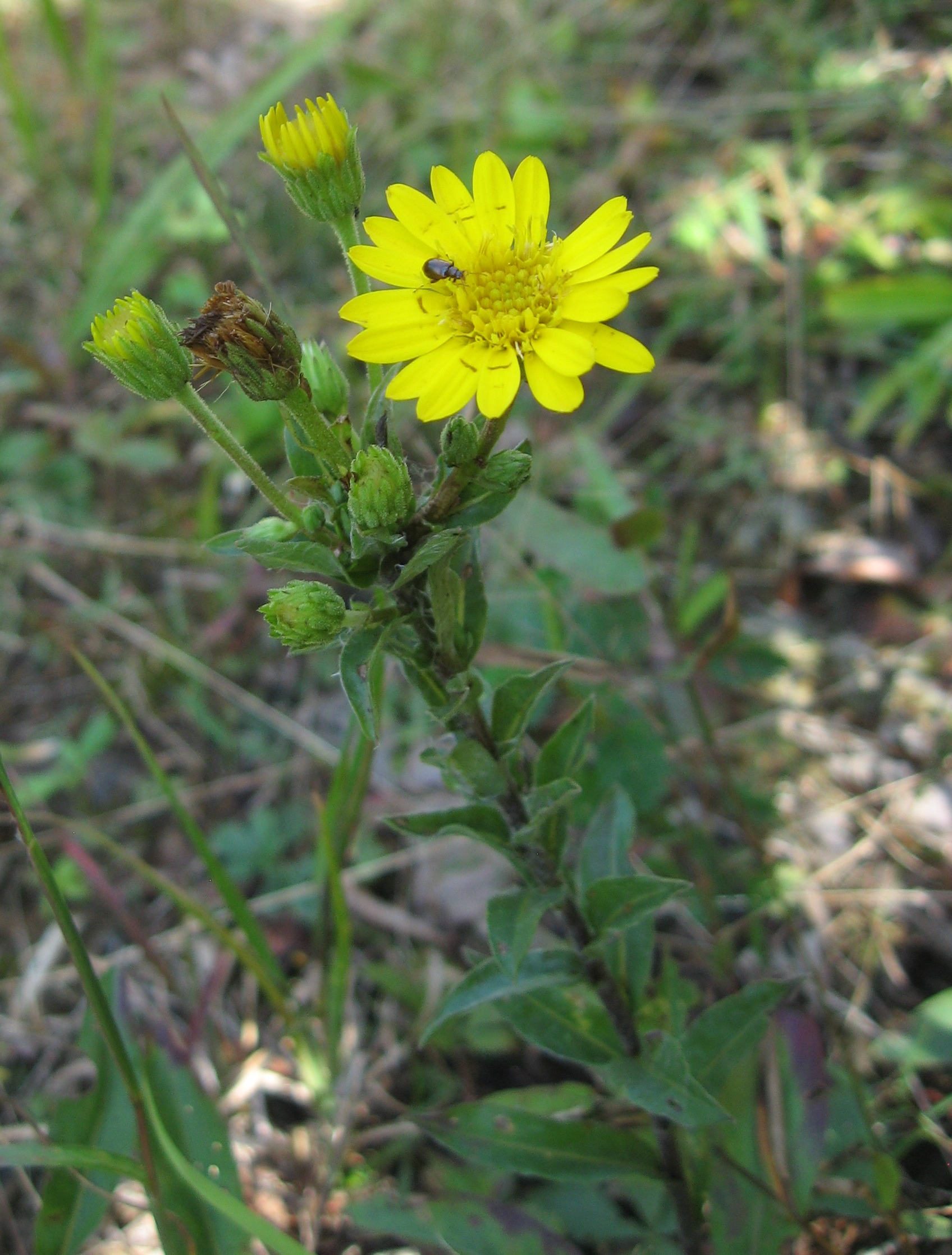

Conservation status
- Secure (NatureServe)

Scientific classification
- Kingdom: Plantae
- Clade: Tracheophytes
- Clade: Angiosperms
- Clade: Eudicots
- Clade: Asterids
- Order: Asterales
- Family: Asteraceae
- Genus: Chrysopsis
- Species: C. mariana

Binomial name
- Chrysopsis mariana (L.) Elliott

Synonyms
- Diplogon mariana (L.) Raf.; Diplogon marianum (L.) Raf.; Diplopappus marianus (L.) Cass. ex Hook.; Heterotheca mariana (L.) Shinners; Inula glandulosa Lam.; Inula mariana L.

= Chrysopsis mariana =

Species of plant

Chrysopsis mariana, known as the Maryland golden-aster, is a North American species of plants in the family Asteraceae. The Maryland golden-aster ranges from Rhode Island and New York, west to Kentucky and southern Ohio, and south as far as Florida and Texas.

== Description ==
Compared to other asters, the Maryland golden-aster has broader leaves and larger flowers. Because of its silky stems, the Maryland golden-asters are also known as silkgrass. Like its relatives the prairie golden-aster and the grass-leaved golden-aster, the Maryland golden-aster blooms only from August to October. The Maryland golden-aster grows one to two feet tall. It grows in a variety of habitats including fields, natural rock outcrops, and open areas.

=== Flowers ===
==== Florets ====
Each flower head is made up of ray florets and disc florets. The 10-22 ray florets are gold or yellow in color.

The discs have 25-40 disc florets.

== Distribution and habitat ==
C. mariana is native to the eastern and southeastern United States, found in Ohio and New York south to Florida and west to Texas.

It is found in humid and mild climates with ample rainfall, tolerating temperatures ranging from 3 to 33 degrees Celsius.

The species is listed as threatened by the Rhode Island Department of Environmental Management and as endangered by the Pennsylvania Department of Conservation and Natural Resources.

== Ecology ==
Chrysopsis mariana is insect pollinated and is recorded to have been visited in northern Florida by Agapostemon splendens, Andrena fulvipennis, and Augochlorella aurata, Augochloropsis metallica, Augochloropsis sumptuosa, Ceratina , Halictus poeyi/ligatus, Lasioglossum pectorale, Paranthidium jugatorium, and Perdita bishoppi.
