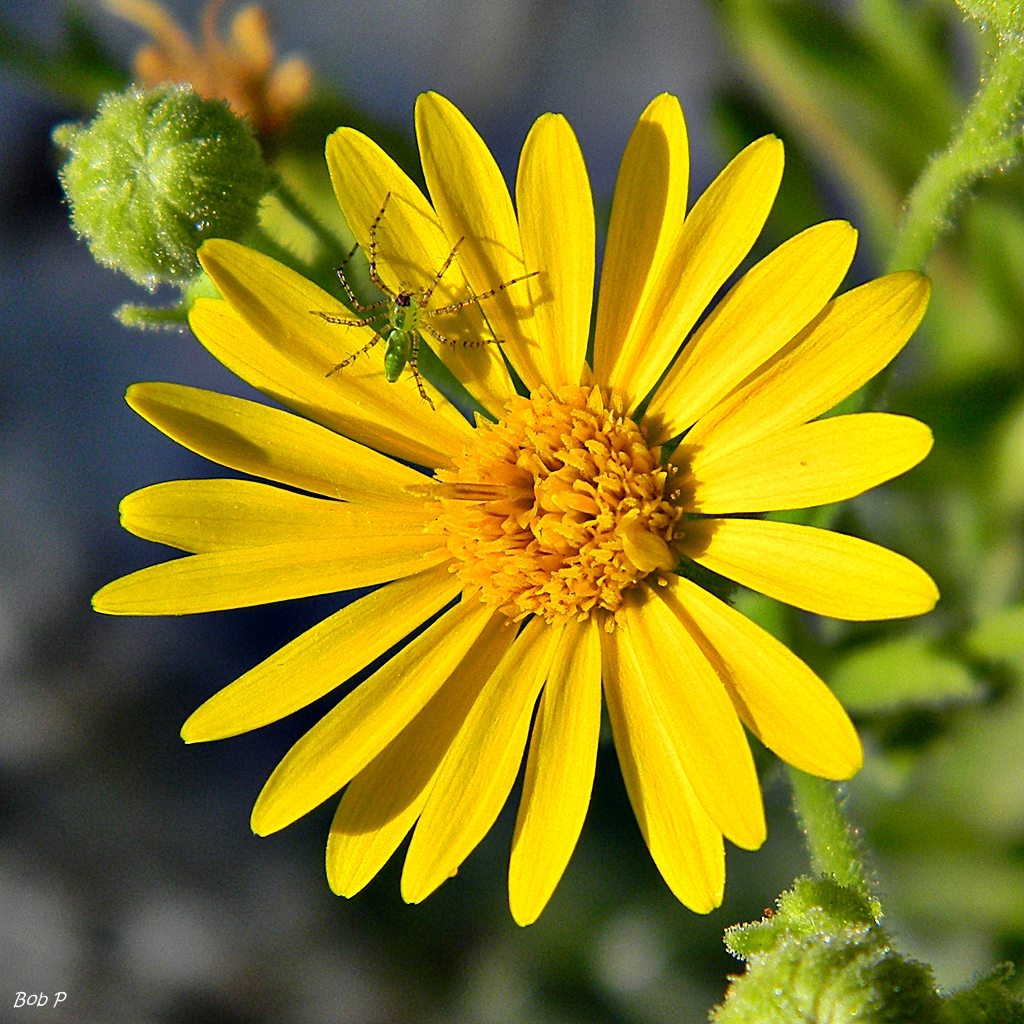
- Chrysopsis scabrella

Scientific classification
- Kingdom: Plantae
- Clade: Tracheophytes
- Clade: Angiosperms
- Clade: Eudicots
- Clade: Asterids
- Order: Asterales
- Family: Asteraceae
- Tribe: Astereae
- Subtribe: Chrysopsidinae
- Genus: Chrysopsis (Nutt.) Elliott

Synonyms
- Inula subg. Chrysopsis Nutt.; Heterotheca sect. Chrysopsis (Nutt.) V.L.Harms; Diplogon Raf.; Inula sect. Chrysopsis Nutt.; Diplopappus Cass.

= Chrysopsis =

Golden asters

Genus of plants

Chrysopsis (golden asters) are plants in the family Asteraceae native to the southern and eastern United States. All the species are found in Florida, although some are found in other states as well.

These are annual and perennial herbs bearing daisy-like flower heads with yellow disc florets and usually yellow ray florets. Some species formerly classified in this genus are now included in other genera: Heterotheca, Pityopsis, Stenotus, Ionactis, Aster, Eucephalus, Erigeron, Machaeranthera, Croptilon, Xanthisma, Oclemena, Bradburia, Oxypappus, Arnica, and Helichrysopsis.

Golden asters are often used as food plants by the larvae of some Lepidoptera species, including Schinia petulans (which feeds exclusively on C. subulata).

Accepted species

- Chrysopsis delaneyi - DeLaney's golden aster - Florida
- Chrysopsis floridana - Florida golden aster - Florida
- Chrysopsis godfreyi - Godfrey's golden aster - Florida, Alabama
- Chrysopsis gossypina - Cottony golden aster - from Florida north to Virginia and west to Louisiana
- Chrysopsis highlandsensis - Highlands County golden aster - Florida
- Chrysopsis lanuginosa - Lynn Haven golden aster - Florida
- Chrysopsis latisquamea - Pineland golden aster - Florida
- Chrysopsis linearifolia - Narrowleaf golden aster - Florida
- Chrysopsis mariana - Maryland golden aster - from Florida north to New York and Ohio, west to Texas
- Chrysopsis scabrella - Coastal plain golden aster - Florida, Carolinas
- Chrysopsis subulata - Scrubland golden aster - Florida
