= M. juncea =

M. juncea may refer to:

- Machaeranthera juncea, an aster native to northern Mexico
- Machaerina juncea, a rhizomatous plant
- Macrotyphula juncea, a gilled mushroom
- Maerua juncea, a dicotyledonous plant
- Menodora juncea, a perennial plant
- Mollugo juncea, an annual plant
