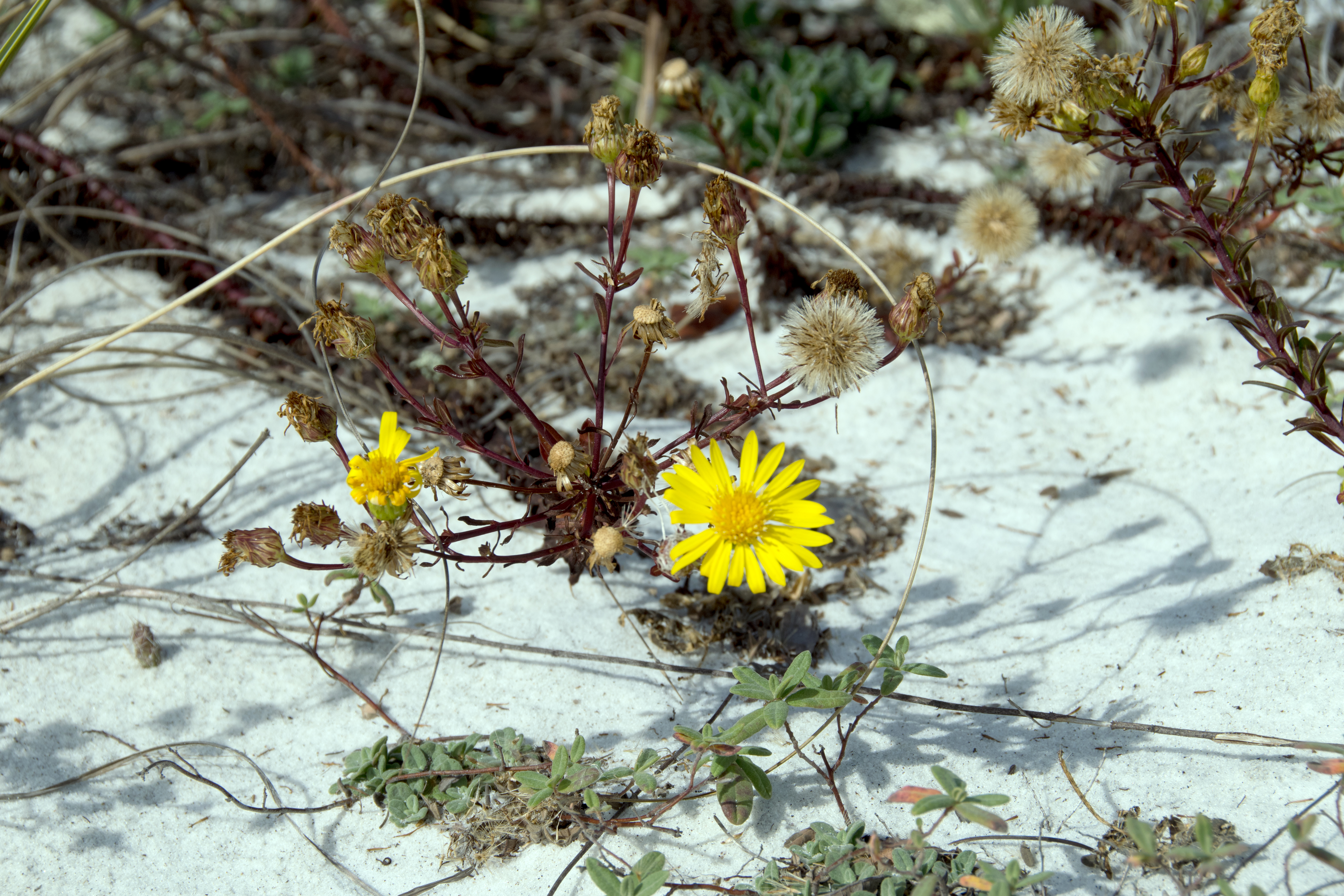
- At Grayton Beach State Park, Florida

Conservation status
- Imperiled (NatureServe)

Scientific classification
- Kingdom: Plantae
- Clade: Tracheophytes
- Clade: Angiosperms
- Clade: Eudicots
- Clade: Asterids
- Order: Asterales
- Family: Asteraceae
- Genus: Chrysopsis
- Species: C. godfreyi

Binomial name
- Chrysopsis godfreyi Semple

= Chrysopsis godfreyi =

Species of plant

Chrysopsis godfreyi, or Godfrey's goldenaster, is a North American species of flowering plant in the family Asteraceae. It is native to the states of Florida and Alabama in the southeastern United States.

Chrysopsis godfreyi is an herb up to 50 cm (20 inches) tall, with a large taproot and most of its leaves in a rosette close to the ground. It produces numerous yellow flower heads in large arrays, each head having both ray florets and disc florets. The species grows on sand dunes and other sandy areas along the Gulf Coast in southern Alabama and in the Florida Panhandle.
