= Erigeron squarrosus =

Erigeron squarrosus may refer to three different species of plants:

- Erigeron squarrosus Walter, a synonym for Chrysopsis gossypina subsp. gossypina (Michx.) Elliott
- Erigeron squarrosus Lindl., a synonym for Erigeron glaucus Ker Gawl.
- Erigeron squarrosus (L.) Clairv., a synonym for Pentanema spiraeifolium (L.) D.Gut.Larr. et al.
