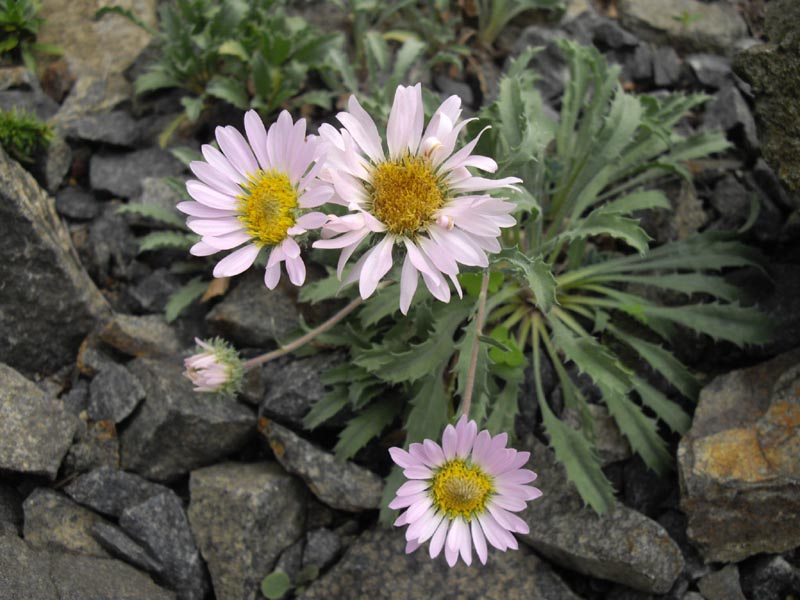

Conservation status
- Vulnerable (NatureServe)

Scientific classification
- Kingdom: Plantae
- Clade: Tracheophytes
- Clade: Angiosperms
- Clade: Eudicots
- Clade: Asterids
- Order: Asterales
- Family: Asteraceae
- Genus: Xanthisma
- Species: X. coloradoense

Binomial name
- Xanthisma coloradoense (A.Gray) D.R.Morgan & R.L.Hartman

= Xanthisma coloradoense =

Species of flowering plant

Xanthisma coloradoense (syn. Aster coloradoensis, Machaeranthera coloradoensis) is a species of flowering plant in the family Asteraceae known by the common name Colorado tansyaster. It is native to Colorado and Wyoming in the United States.

This cushion plant is a perennial herb growing from a taproot and branching caudex. It grows up to 14 centimeters tall, with several to many thick, hairy stems. The hairy leaves are lance-shaped to spatula-shaped and the edges are lined with large, sharp teeth tipped with bristles. The inflorescence is a solitary flower head with narrow, white-tipped phyllaries. It contains pink or purple ray florets up to 1.5 centimeters long and many disc florets. The fruit may be nearly a centimeter long including its pappus.

There were previously two varieties of this species, but these subtaxa are no longer recognized.

This plant may hybridize with Xanthisma grindelioides.

This plant grows in mountains, often in an alpine climate. Habitat types include grassland, pinyon-juniper woodland, and alpine fellfield. It grows in open areas. There is often little vegetative cover and the terrain is rocky. Associated species in the habitat may include pines Pinus spp., shrubs such as Cercocarpus montanus and Chrysothamnus spp., other plants such as Astragalus spp., Erigeron spp., Potentilla spp., Festuca spp., and Elymus spp., and lichens such as members of genus Xanthoparmelia. It can be found growing with some rare species, including Astragalus molybdenus.

Threats to this species are not well known because the plant has not been studied enough yet. Potential threats include recreational activity such as off-road vehicle use, invasive species, grazing and trampling by livestock, and energy development, particularly wind power.
