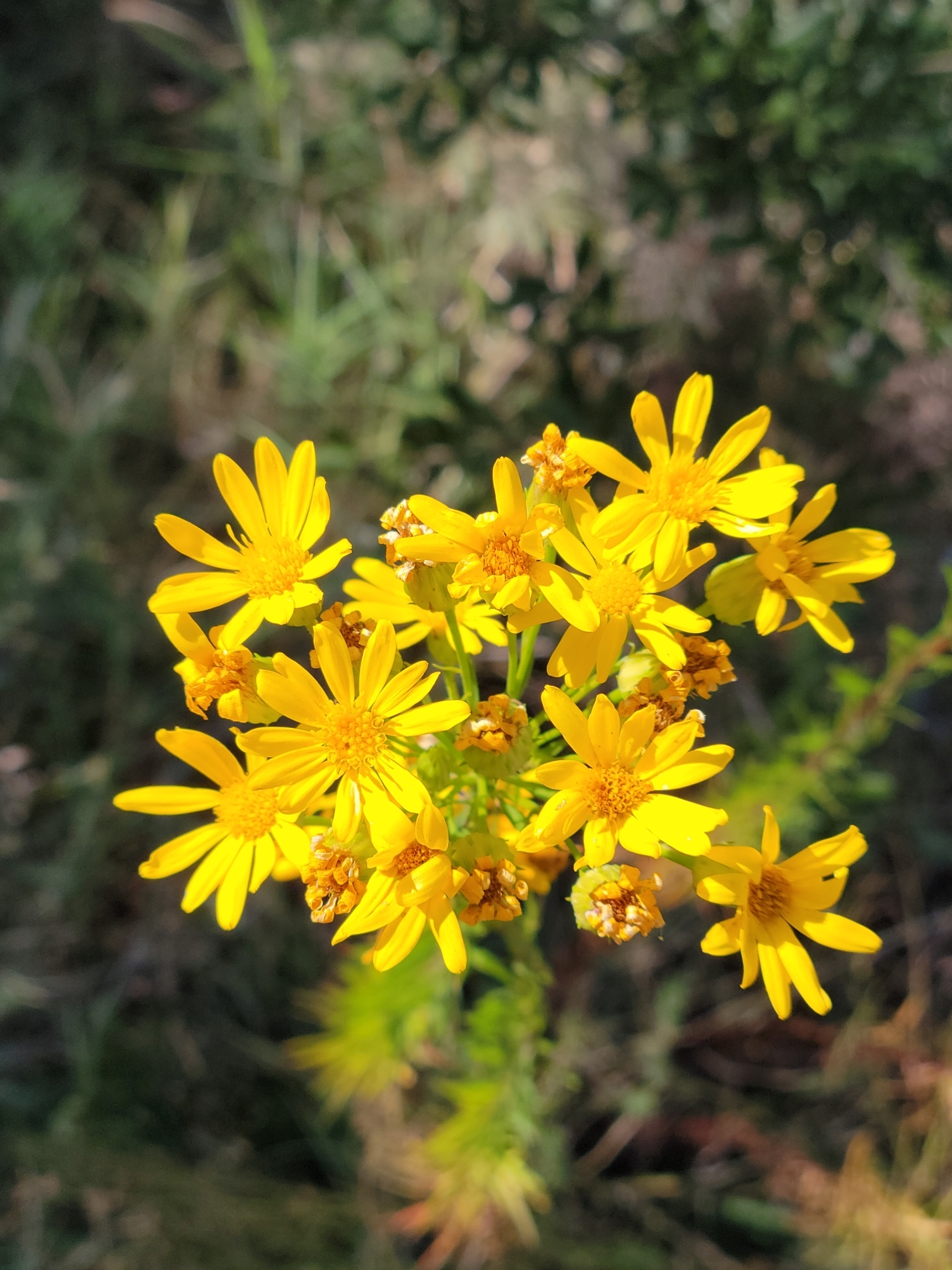
- Chrysopsis linearifolia subsp. linearifolia

Conservation status
- Apparently Secure (NatureServe)

Scientific classification
- Kingdom: Plantae
- Clade: Tracheophytes
- Clade: Angiosperms
- Clade: Eudicots
- Clade: Asterids
- Order: Asterales
- Family: Asteraceae
- Genus: Chrysopsis
- Species: C. linearifolia

Binomial name
- Chrysopsis linearifolia Semple

= Chrysopsis linearifolia =

Species of plant

Chrysopsis linearifolia, the narrowleaf goldenaster, is a North American species of flowering plant in the family Asteraceae. It has been found only in Florida.

Chrysopsis linearifolia is a biennial herb up to 200 cm (80 inches) tall. Stems are generally unbranched and hairless. Each plant can produce as many as 100 yellow flower heads, each head with both ray florets and disc florets. The species grows in sandy and grassy locations.
