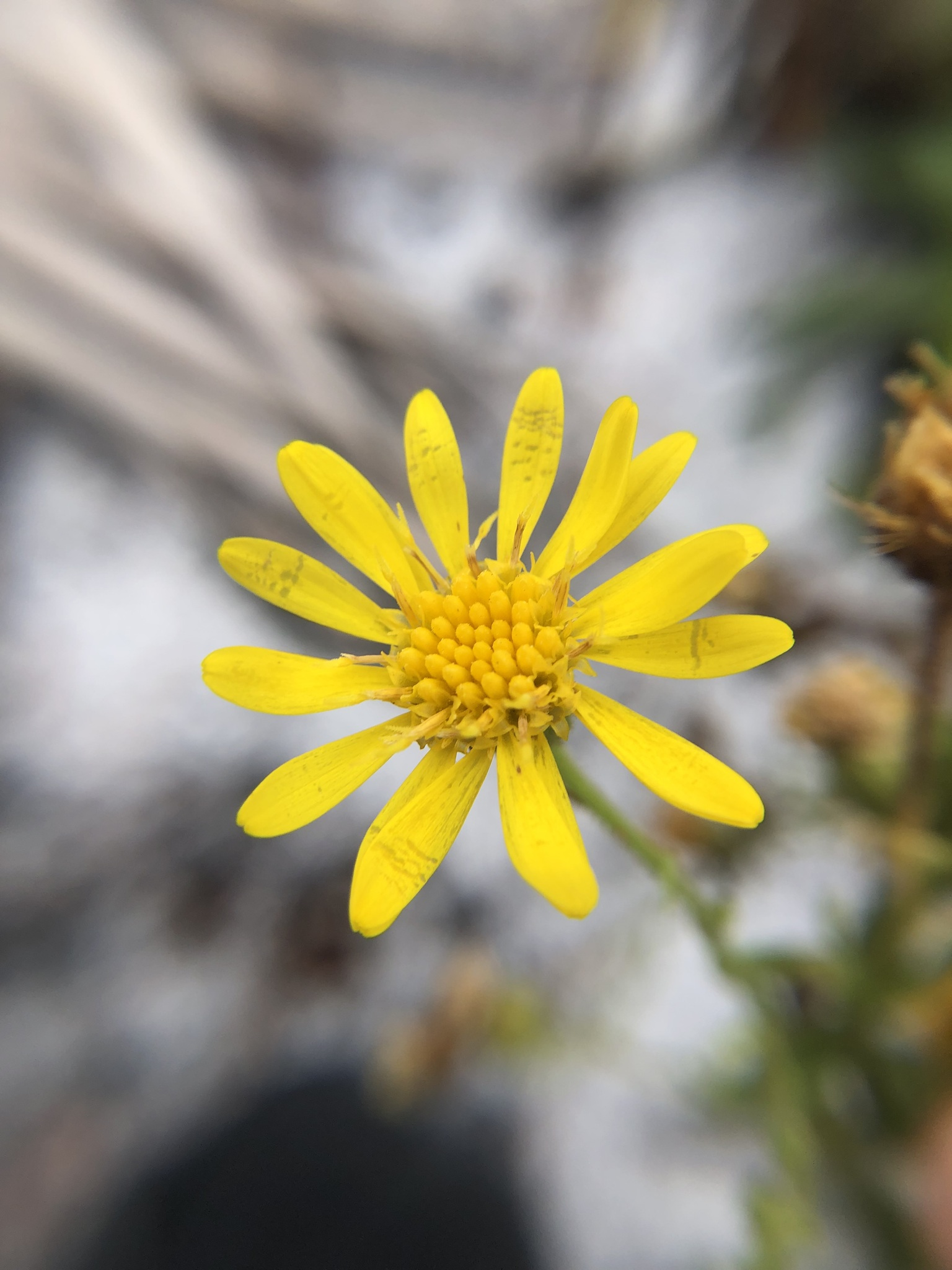

Conservation status
- Vulnerable (NatureServe)

Scientific classification
- Kingdom: Plantae
- Clade: Tracheophytes
- Clade: Angiosperms
- Clade: Eudicots
- Clade: Asterids
- Order: Asterales
- Family: Asteraceae
- Genus: Chrysopsis
- Species: C. delaneyi

Binomial name
- Chrysopsis delaneyi Wunderlin & Semple

= Chrysopsis delaneyi =

Species of plant

Chrysopsis delaneyi, or DeLaney's goldenaster, is one of the endemic species to the U.S. state of Florida, recently discovered in the genus Chrysopsis, a small group of herbaceous plants of the family Asteraceae, known commonly as the "golden asters" and primarily native and restricted to Florida.

== History ==
Several species of Chrysopsis previously unknown to science have been discovered in recent decades. Among these, is Chrysopsis delaneyi, "DeLaney's goldenaster", which was discovered in the mid-1980s by Kris DeLaney, a central Florida botanist.

== Habitat ==
Chrysopsis delaneyi is endemic to Florida, where it is highly endangered and has a very restricted range. By the mid 20th century most of its original longleaf pine / turkey oak sandhill ecosystem and habitat were removed by corporate citrus farming.

Most of the Chrysopsis species are endemic to Florida, being limited to relatively small regions of Florida's well-drained, sandy ridges. The plants occur in dry, nutrient-poor, xeric upland ecosystems, including sand pine scrub, longleaf pine / turkey oak sandhills. They are weakly perennial in habit, bright green, tall and leafy, produce large, "lettuce-like" rosettes, and are covered with viscid (resin-producing) hairs (glandular-stipitate trichomes). The flowers are borne at the tops of leafy stems that are up to 1.5 m tall, and are bright yellow and range from about 2.4 cm to 5.0 cm in diameter.

== Description ==
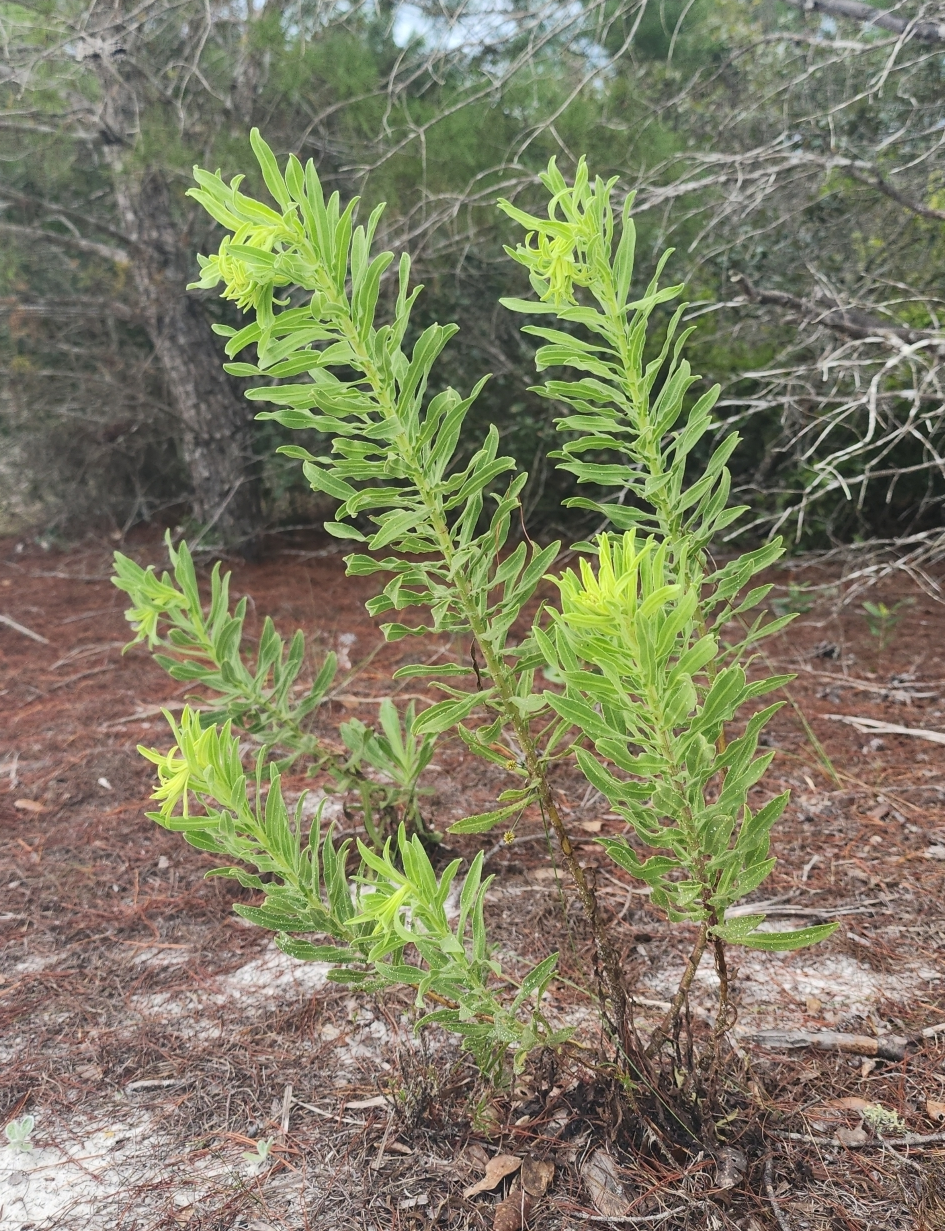
Growth habit

Chrysopsis delaneyi is morphologically and genetically variable. It is represented by a complex of ecotypes and/or varieties associated and adapted to Florida's major ridges and discrete upland systems. The plant is restricted primarily to four major metapopulations: Lake Wales Ridge (LWR), Orange County Ridge (OCR), southern Atlantic Coastal Ridge (ACR), and a system of geologically younger, lower ridges between the LWR and ACR. [the ridges are generally as per described and mapped by William White (1970); Geomorphology of Florida, USGS].

Chrysopsis delaneyi was formally described in 2003, and named in honor of its discoverer. Although locally abundant at some small sites, the species is highly endangered due to a near complete loss of its original habitat. Morphological and genetic analysis suggests that the metapopulations of C. delaneyi may actually represent distinct taxa which may have arisen from genetic bottle-necking and subsequent long-term, island-like biogeographic isolation.

Kris DeLaney (1951-*) has discovered many other new species of plants in central Florida, including a second golden aster, C. highlandsensis (Highlands County goldenaster).
