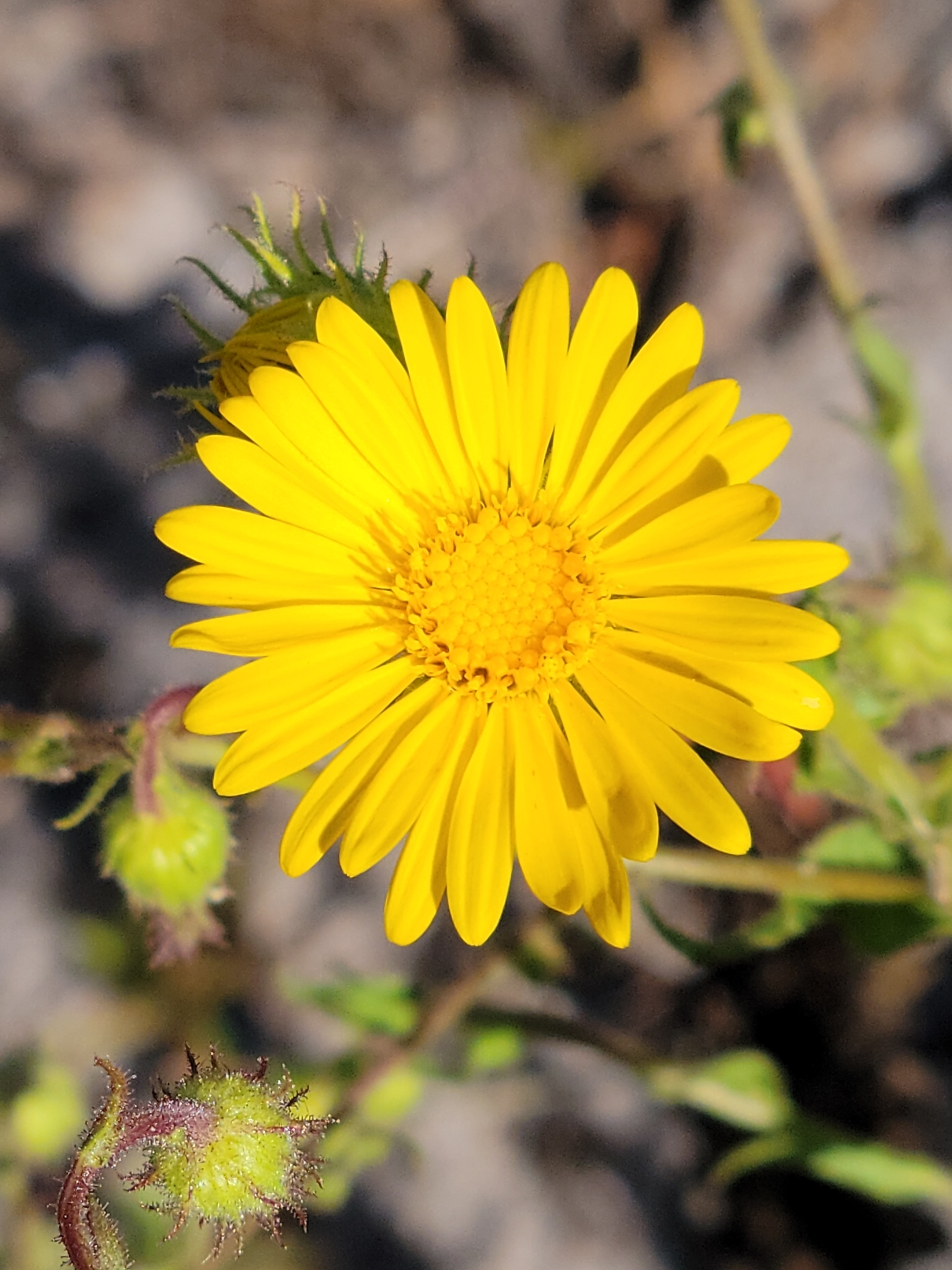

Conservation status
- Apparently Secure (NatureServe)

Scientific classification
- Kingdom: Plantae
- Clade: Tracheophytes
- Clade: Angiosperms
- Clade: Eudicots
- Clade: Asterids
- Order: Asterales
- Family: Asteraceae
- Genus: Chrysopsis
- Species: C. lanuginosa

Binomial name
- Chrysopsis lanuginosa Small

= Chrysopsis lanuginosa =

Species of plant

Chrysopsis lanuginosa, called the Lynn Haven goldenaster, is a North American species of flowering plant in the family Asteraceae. It has been found only in the Florida Panhandle.

Chrysopsis lanuginosa is a perennial herb up to 10 cm (40 inches) tall. It generally produces only one stem for each rosette of leaves. Both the leaves and the stem are covered with white woolly hairs. Each stalk can produce as many as 80 yellow flower heads and a loose array. The species grows in sandy and grassy locations.
