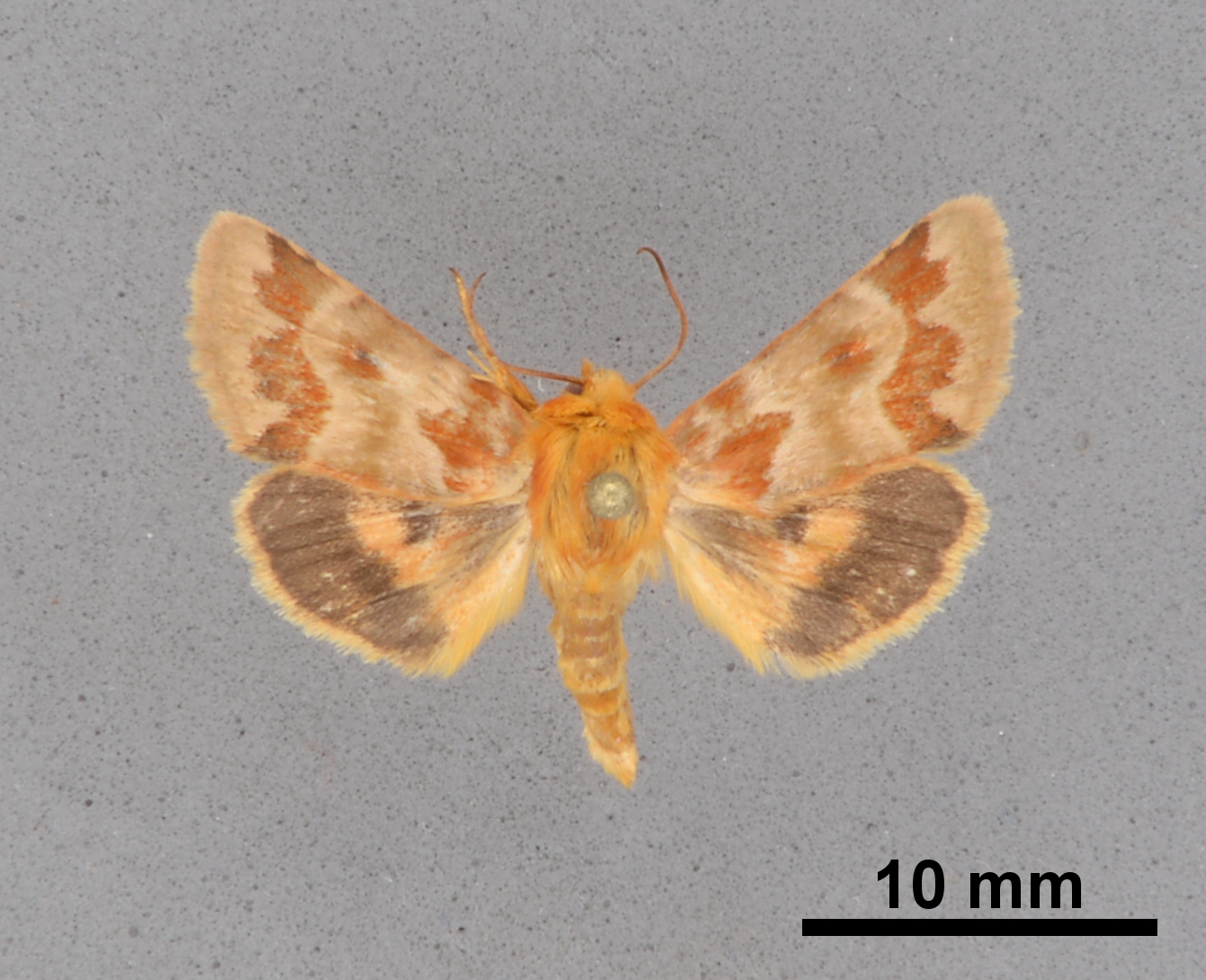

Scientific classification
- Domain: Eukaryota
- Kingdom: Animalia
- Phylum: Arthropoda
- Class: Insecta
- Order: Lepidoptera
- Superfamily: Noctuoidea
- Family: Noctuidae
- Genus: Schinia
- Species: S. petulans

Binomial name
- Schinia petulans H. Edwards, 1884

= Schinia petulans =

Species of moth

Schinia petulans, the impatient flower moth, is a moth of the family Noctuidae. The species was first described by Henry Edwards in 1884. It is found in the US states of Texas, Arkansas, Oklahoma and Florida.

There seem to be two generations per year.

The larvae feed on Chrysopsis subulata.
