= Paranthidium flavolineatum =

Scientific classification
- Kingdom: Animalia
- Phylum: Arthropoda
- Clade: Pancrustacea
- Class: Insecta
- Order: Hymenoptera
- Family: Megachilidae
- Genus: Paranthidium
- Species: P. flavolineatum

Binomial name
- Paranthidium flavolineatum (Smith, 1879)

Synonyms
- Anthidium flavolineatum Smith, 1879

Species of bee

Paranthidium flavolineatum is a species of bee in the family Megachilidae, the leaf-cutter, carder, or mason bees.

== Distribution ==
Middle America
