= Xanthisma paradoxum =

Scientific classification
- Kingdom: Plantae
- Clade: Tracheophytes
- Clade: Angiosperms
- Clade: Eudicots
- Clade: Asterids
- Order: Asterales
- Family: Asteraceae
- Genus: Xanthisma
- Species: X. paradoxum

Binomial name
- Xanthisma paradoxum (B.L. Turner & R.L. Hartm.) G.L. Nesom & B.L. Turner

Synonyms
- Haplopappus spinulosus var. paradoxus (B.L. Turner & R.L. Hartm.) Cronquist; Machaeranthera pinnatifida var. paradoxa B.L. Turner & R.L. Hartm.; Xanthisma spinulosum var. paradoxum (B.L. Turner & R.L. Hartm.) D.R. Morgan & R.L. Hartm.

Species of flowering plant

Xanthisma paradoxum is a plant species native to the "Four Corners" region where Colorado, Arizona, New Mexico, and Utah meet. It is known only Montezuma County (Colorado), San Juan County (Utah), and Apache County (Arizona). The species is named for the Town of Paradox, Colorado, where the type specimen was collected. It grows in disturbed sites, washes, desert scrub, and open pinyon-juniper woodlands.

Xanthisma paradoxum is a branching herb up to 15 cm (6 inches) high. It has deeply dissected basal leaves which are persistent and dense, plus narrow linear leaves on the lower half of the stems.
