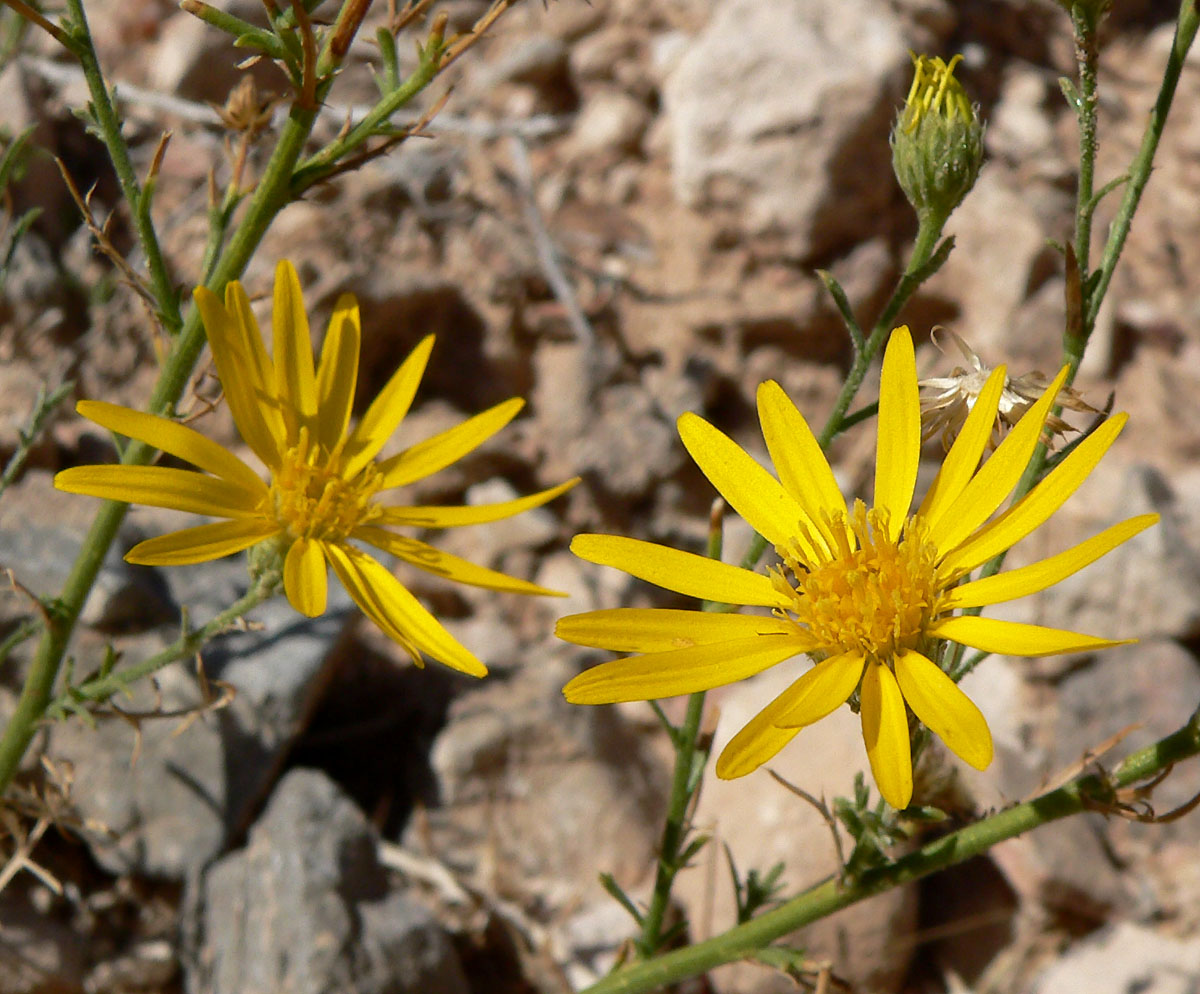
- On Frenchman Mountain, Nevada

Conservation status
- Secure (NatureServe)

Scientific classification
- Kingdom: Plantae
- Clade: Tracheophytes
- Clade: Angiosperms
- Clade: Eudicots
- Clade: Asterids
- Order: Asterales
- Family: Asteraceae
- Genus: Xanthisma
- Species: X. spinulosum

Binomial name
- Xanthisma spinulosum (Pursh) D.R. Morgan & R.L. Hartm.

Synonyms
- List: Amellus spinulosus Pursh; Aster pinnatifidus (Hook.) Kuntze; Aster pinnatifidus f. pinnatifidus; Chrysopsis lamarckii Nutt.; Dieteria pinnata Nutt.; Dieteria spinulosa (Pursh) Nutt.; Diplopappus pinnatifidus Hook.; Eriocarpum australe Greene; Eriocarpum spinulosum (Pursh) Greene; Haplopappus arenarius subsp. incisifolius Johnst.; Haplopappus arenarius var. incisifolius I.M.Johnst.; Haplopappus coulteri Harv. & A.Gray; Haplopappus incisifolium I.M.Johnst.; Haplopappus spinulosus (Pursh) Brandegee; Haplopappus spinulosus (Pursh) DC.; Haplopappus spinulosus subsp. australis (Greene) H.M.Hall; Haplopappus spinulosus subsp. cotula (Small) H.M.Hall; Haplopappus spinulosus subsp. incisifolius (I.M.Johnst.) H.M.Hall; Haplopappus spinulosus subsp. laevis (Wooton & Standl.) H.M.Hall; Haplopappus spinulosus subsp. typicus H.M.Hall; Haplopappus spinulosus var. canescens A.Gray; Haplopappus spinulosus var. genuinus S.F.Blake; Haplopappus spinulosus var. glaber A.Gray; Haplopappus spinulosus var. spinulosus; Haplopappus spinulosus var. turbinellus (Rydb.) S.F.Blake; Machaeranthera australis (Greene) Shinners; Machaeranthera incisifolia (I.M.Johnst.) G.L.Nesom; Machaeranthera laevis (Wooton & Standl.) Shinners; Machaeranthera pinnata (Nutt.) Shinners; Machaeranthera pinnata f. pinnata; Machaeranthera pinnatifida (Hook.) Shinners; Machaeranthera pinnatifida subsp. pinnatifida; Machaeranthera pinnatifida var. incisifolia (I.M.Johnst.) B.L.Turner & R.L.Hartm.; Sideranthus australe (Greene) Rydb.; Sideranthus australis (Greene) Rydb.; Sideranthus cotula Small; Sideranthus laevis Wooton & Standl.; Sideranthus machaeranthera Small; Sideranthus pinnatifidus (Nutt.); Sideranthus puberulus Rydb.; Sideranthus spinulosus (Pursh) Nutt.; Sideranthus spinulosus (Pursh) Nutt. ex Nees; Sideranthus spinulosus (Pursh) Sw.; Sideranthus spinulosus (Pursh) Sweet; Sideranthus spinulosus (Pursh) Sweet ex Rydb.; Sideranthus spinulosus var. spinulosus; Sideranthus turbinellus Rydb.; Sideranthus wootonii (Greene) Standl.; Starkea pinnata Nutt.; Xanthisma spinulosum subsp. spinulosum

= Xanthisma spinulosum =

Species of flower

Xanthisma spinulosum, the spiny goldenweed, is a species of flowering plant of the genus Xanthisma native to western North America.

Xanthisma spinulosum grows in dry, sandy hot openings, cooler woodlands, and can be found blooming in the spring, summer, or fall.
