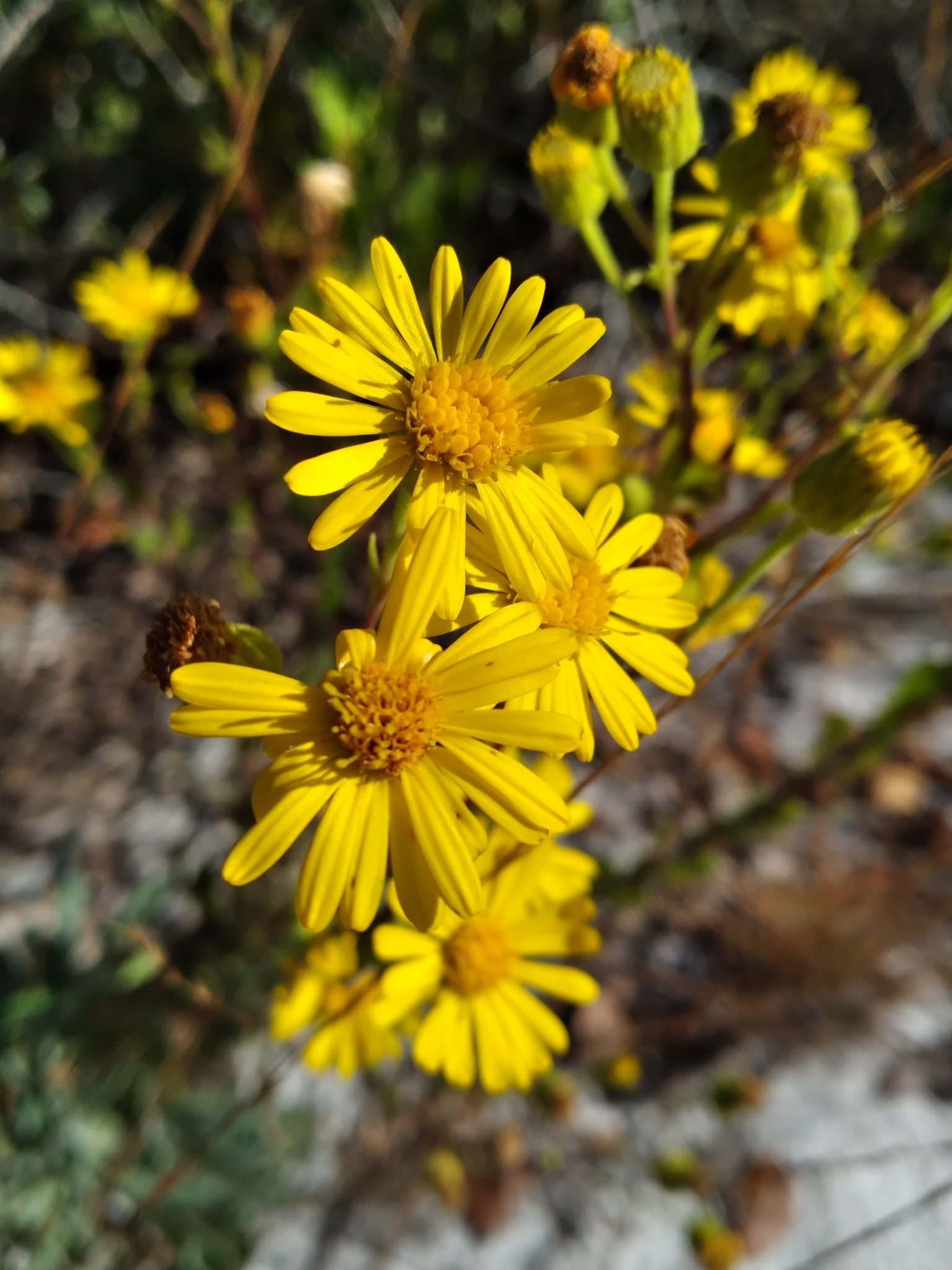
- Flowers
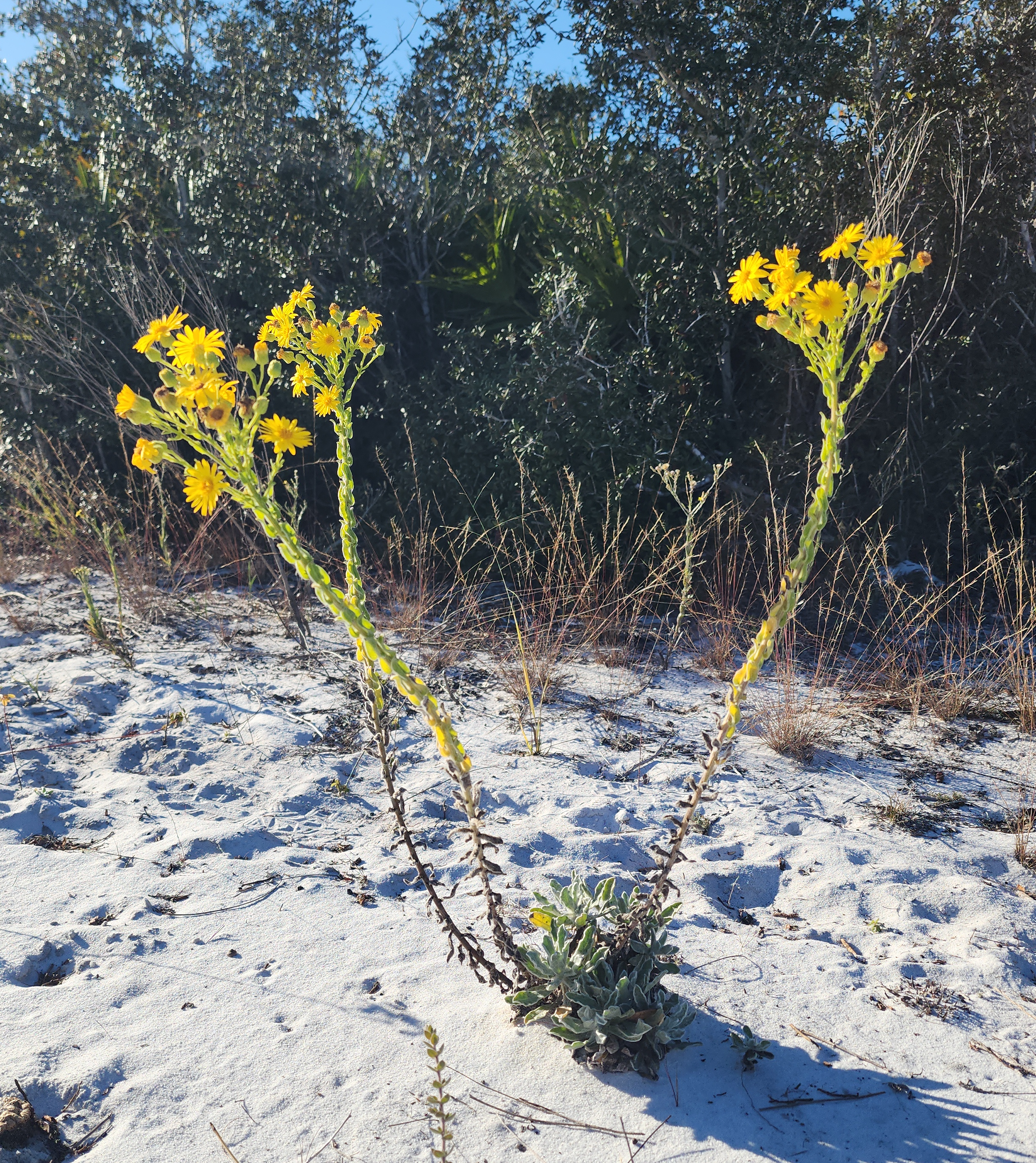
- Habit

Conservation status
- Imperiled (NatureServe)

Scientific classification
- Kingdom: Plantae
- Clade: Tracheophytes
- Clade: Angiosperms
- Clade: Eudicots
- Clade: Asterids
- Order: Asterales
- Family: Asteraceae
- Genus: Chrysopsis
- Species: C. highlandsensis

Binomial name
- Chrysopsis highlandsensis DeLaney & Wunderlin

Synonyms
- Chrysopsis floridana var. highlandsensis (DeLaney & Wunderlin) D.B. Ward

= Chrysopsis highlandsensis =

Species of plant

Chrysopsis highlandsensis, called the Highlands goldenaster, is a North American species of flowering plant in the aster family. It has been found only in three counties in central Florida: Highlands, Polk, and Glades.

Chrysopsis highlandsensis is a perennial herb up to 110 cm (44 inches) tall. It very often produces several stems, each bearing many leaves and as many as 50 yellow flower heads. The species grows in sandy pine woods and wooded scrubland.
