= Golden aster =

Golden aster or goldenaster is a common name for several plants with yellow flowers in the aster family and may refer to:

- Chrysopsis, species are generally called "golden asters"
- Heterotheca, includes some species previously classified in Chrysopsis and called "golden asters"

== See also ==
- False golden aster, a common name for some species of Heterotheca
