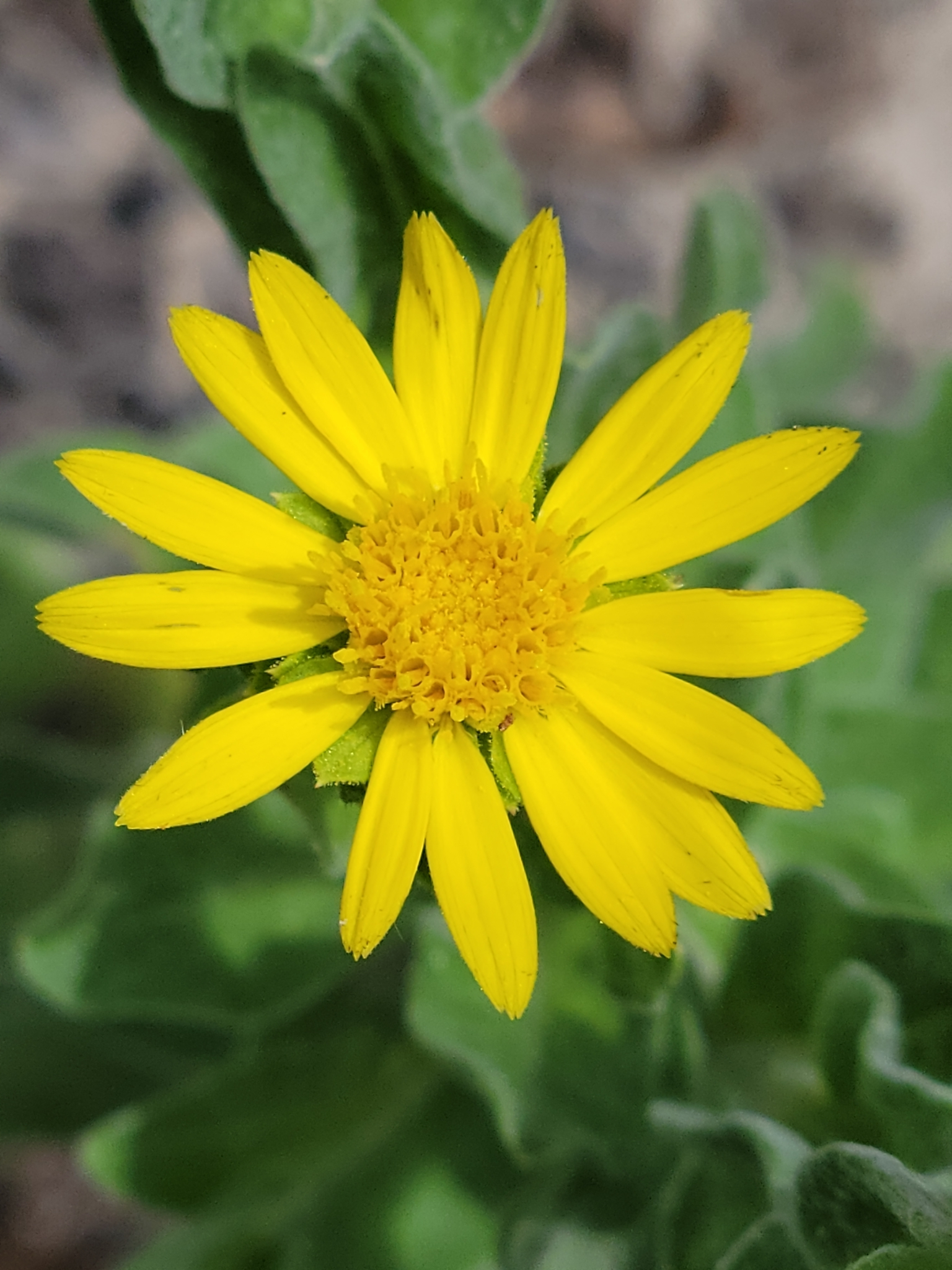

Conservation status
- Vulnerable (NatureServe)

Scientific classification
- Kingdom: Plantae
- Clade: Tracheophytes
- Clade: Angiosperms
- Clade: Eudicots
- Clade: Asterids
- Order: Asterales
- Family: Asteraceae
- Genus: Chrysopsis
- Species: C. latisquamea

Binomial name
- Chrysopsis latisquamea Pollard

= Chrysopsis latisquamea =

Species of plant

Chrysopsis latisquamea, the pineland goldenaster, is a North American species of flowering plant in the family Asteraceae. It has been found only in Florida.

Chrysopsis latisquamea is a biennial herb up to 70 cm (28 inches) tall. Each plant usually produces only one stem but it can hold as many as 60 yellow flower heads, each head with both ray florets and disc florets. The species grows in sandy locations in open brushlands.

The Latin specific epithet of latisquamea is a portmanteau word, 'latis-' is derived from latus meaning broad and '-squamea' is derived from squama meaning scale.
