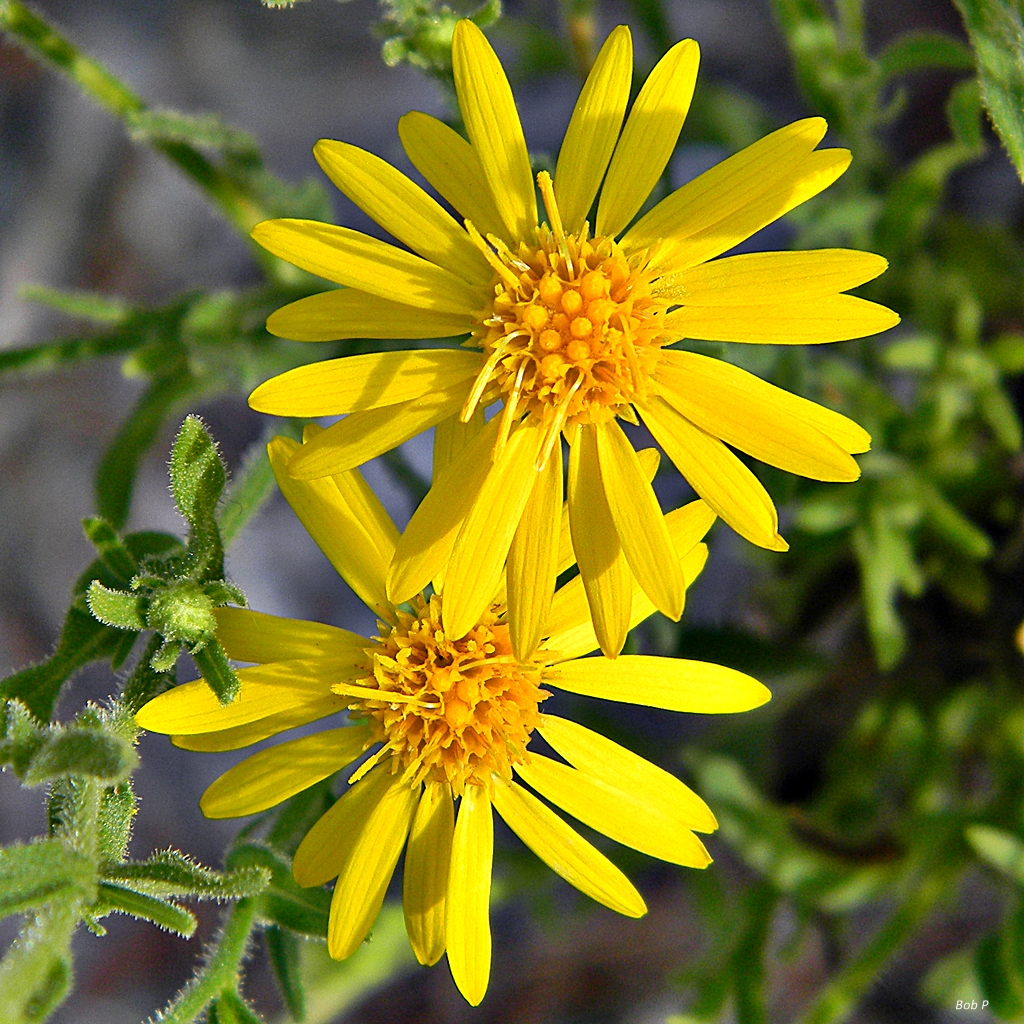

Conservation status
- Apparently Secure (NatureServe)

Scientific classification
- Kingdom: Plantae
- Clade: Tracheophytes
- Clade: Angiosperms
- Clade: Eudicots
- Clade: Asterids
- Order: Asterales
- Family: Asteraceae
- Genus: Chrysopsis
- Species: C. scabrella

Binomial name
- Chrysopsis scabrella Torr. & A.Gray

Synonyms
- Diplogon scabrellum (Torr. & A.Gray) Kuntze; Heterotheca scabrella (Torr. & A.Gray) R.W.Long

= Chrysopsis scabrella =

Species of North American flowering plant

Chrysopsis scabrella, called the Coastalplain goldenaster, is a North American species of flowering plant in the family Asteraceae. It is native primarily to Florida with a few isolated populations in North and South Carolina.

Chrysopsis scabrella is a biennial herb up to 100 cm (40 inches) tall. Most of the leaves are in a rosette close to the ground. There is usually only one flowering stalk, but it can hold as many as 100 yellow flower heads in a loose array. Heads contain both ray florets and disc florets. The species grows in open areas such as fields, roadsides, and savannahs.
