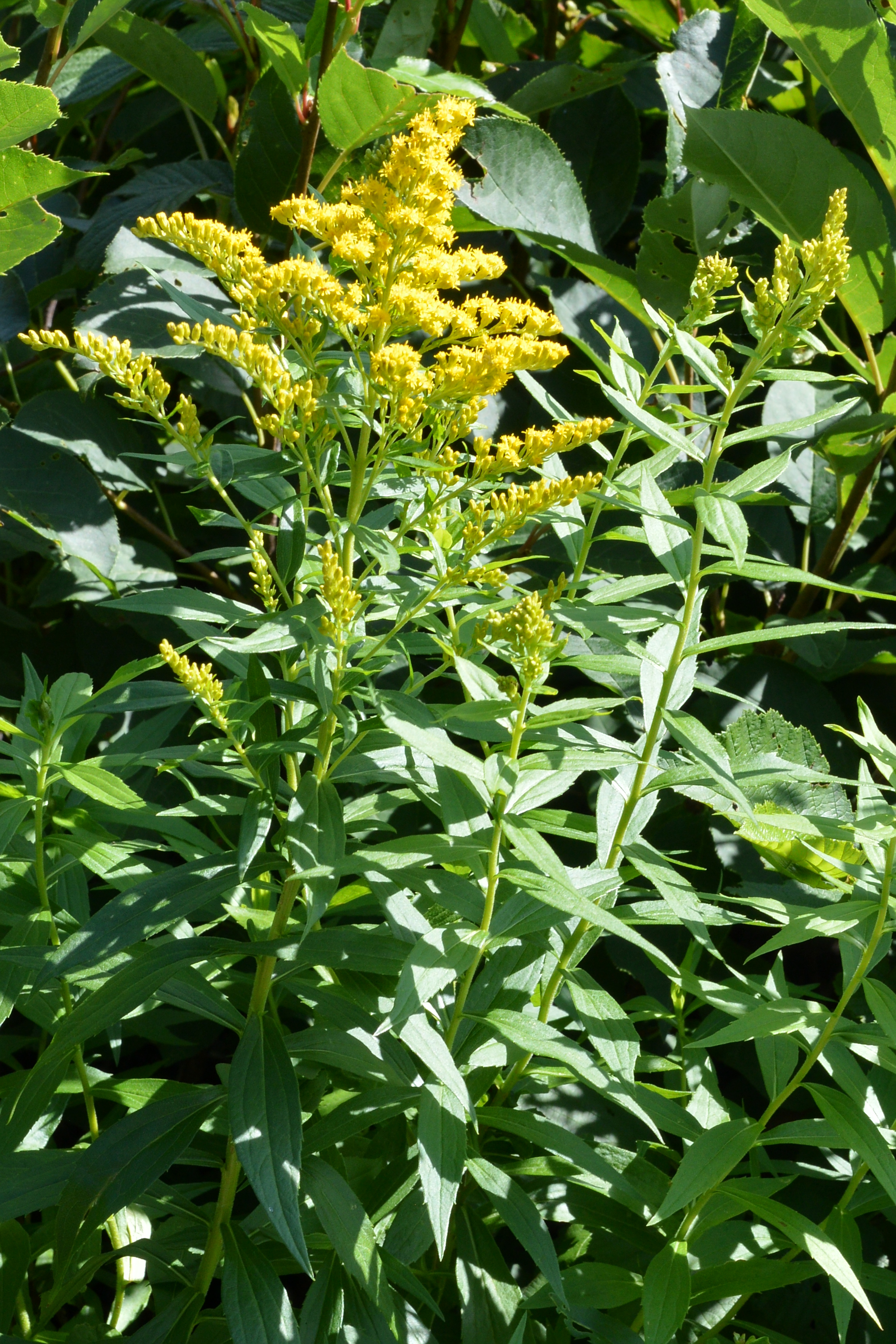

Scientific classification
- Kingdom: Plantae
- Clade: Tracheophytes
- Clade: Angiosperms
- Clade: Eudicots
- Clade: Asterids
- Order: Asterales
- Family: Asteraceae
- Genus: Solidago
- Species: S. brendiae

Binomial name
- Solidago brendiae Semple

= Solidago brendiae =

Species of plant

Solidago brendiae is a species of goldenrod in the family Asteraceae, native to northeastern North America.

Solidago brendiae is a perennial herb up to 160 cm (64 inches) tall, spreading by means of underground rhizomes. Leaves are long and narrow, up to 15 cm (6 inches) long, attached to the stem rather than clustered around the base. One plant can sometimes have as many as 500 small yellow flower heads in a large array at the top of the plant.

The plant is named for Brenda Semple, wife and research partner of the author of the paper in which the species was first described. It is a member of subsection Triplinerviae.

It is found in Labrador, Newfoundland, all three Maritime Provinces, and Québec in Canada, and in Granby, northeastern Vermont, in the United States. It is possible that a few additional populations exist in Maine and Ontario.
