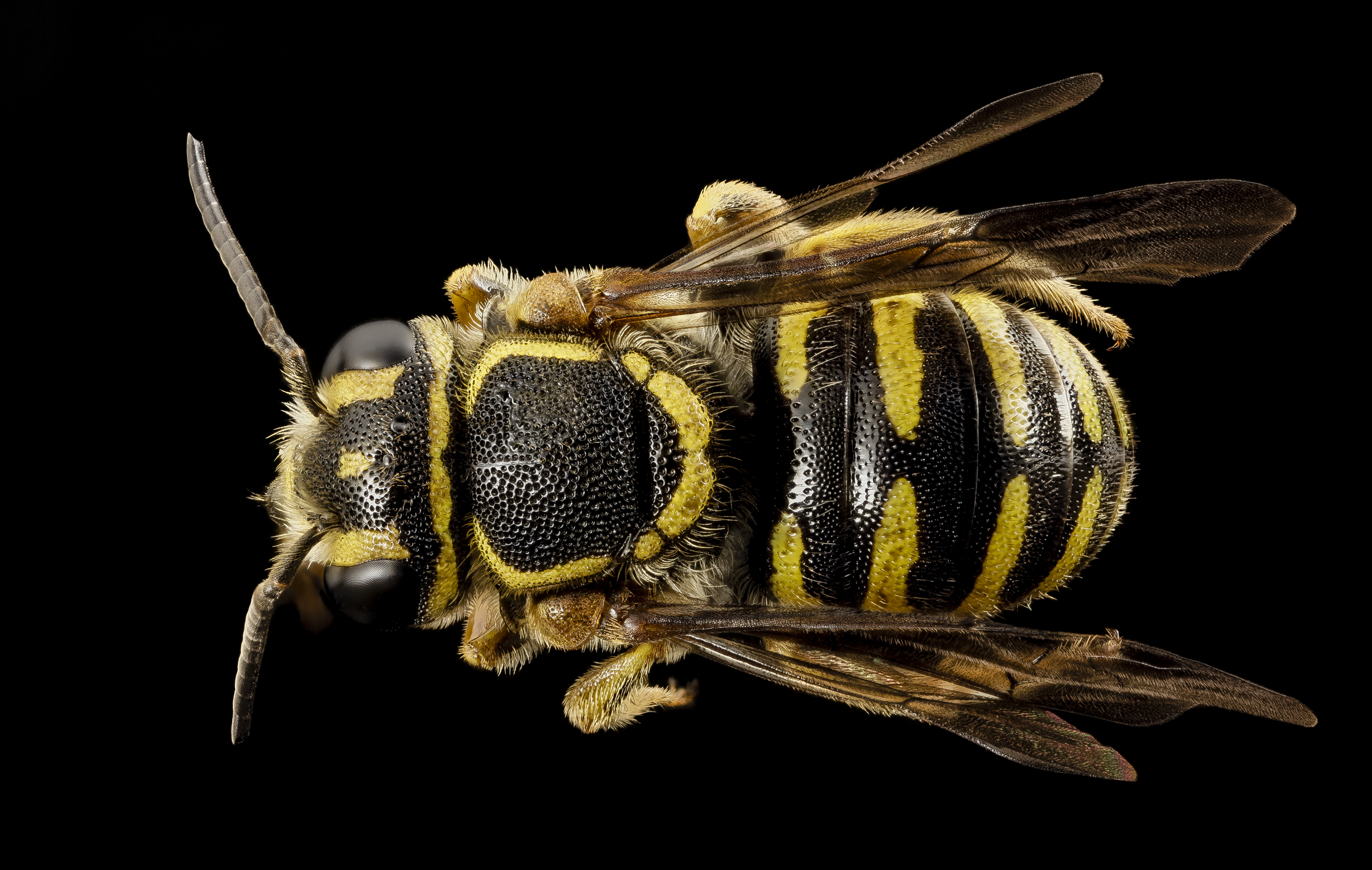
- Paranthidium jugatorium

Scientific classification
- Kingdom: Animalia
- Phylum: Arthropoda
- Class: Insecta
- Order: Hymenoptera
- Family: Megachilidae
- Subfamily: Megachilinae
- Tribe: Anthidiini
- Genus: Paranthidium; Cockerell & Cockerell, 1901

= Paranthidium =

Genus of bees

Paranthidium is a genus of bees in the family Megachilidae.

== Species ==
- Paranthidium flavolineatum (Smith, 1879)
- Paranthidium gabbii (Cresson, 1878)
- Paranthidium impatiens (Smith, 1879)
- Paranthidium jugatorium (Say, 1824)
- Paranthidium orizabae (Dalla Torre, 1890)
- Paranthidium vespoides (Friese, 1925)
