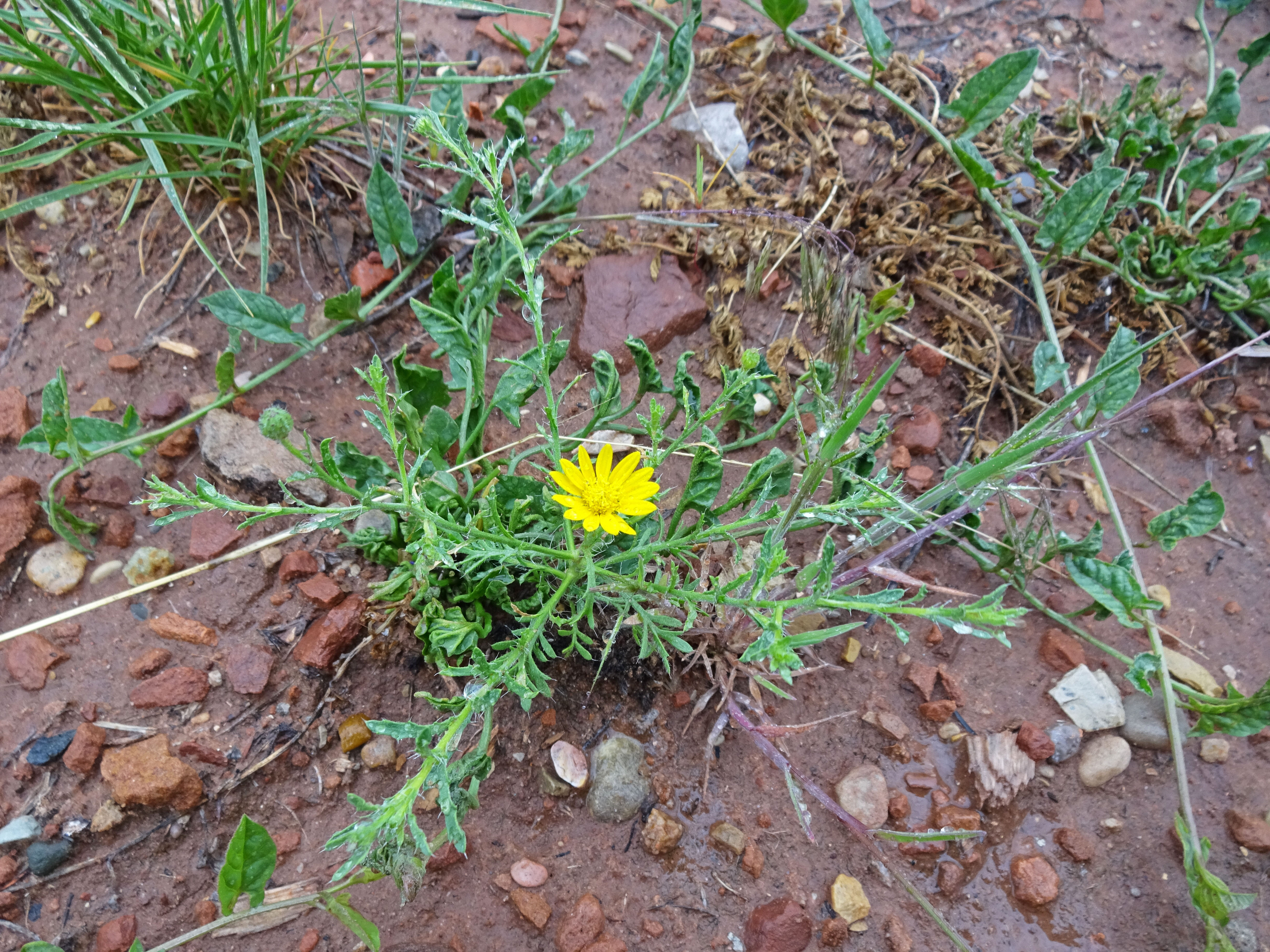

Conservation status
- Secure (NatureServe)

Scientific classification
- Kingdom: Plantae
- Clade: Tracheophytes
- Clade: Angiosperms
- Clade: Eudicots
- Clade: Asterids
- Order: Asterales
- Family: Asteraceae
- Genus: Xanthisma
- Species: X. gracile

Binomial name
- Xanthisma gracile (Nutt.) D.R.Morgan & R.L.Hartm.

Synonyms
- Aster dieteria Kuntze; Dieteria gracilis Nutt.; Eriocarpum gracile (Nutt.) Greene; Haplopappus gracilis (Nutt.) A.Gray; Haplopappus ravenii R.C.Jacks.; Machaeranthera gracilis (Nutt.) Shinners; Sideranthus gracilis (Nutt.) A.Nelson

= Xanthisma gracile =

Species of flowering plant

Xanthisma gracile is a species of annual flowering plant in the family Asteraceae known by the common names slender goldenweed and annual bristleweed.

== Range and habitat ==
It is native the southwestern United States and northern Mexico, where it grows in the deserts and plateaus.

== Growth pattern ==
It is a bristly annual herb growing erect up to 45 cm tall.

== Leaves and stems ==
The oval or oblong leaves are 1–3 cm long and divided into lobes or teeth tipped with bristles.

== Flowers and fruit ==
The inflorescence bears one or more flower heads lined with pointed, roughly hairy phyllaries. The head has a center of many yellow disc florets and a fringe of 16 to 18 yellow ray florets roughly a centimeter long. The fruit is a woolly achene 2 to 3 millimeters long tipped with a pappus.

== Genetics ==
Xanthisma gracile has extra chromosomes that do not have any functional genes (B chromosomes), and about which little is known. Its chromosome count is given as 2n=4 by Munz and Keck.
