= Paranthidium orizabae =

Scientific classification
- Kingdom: Animalia
- Phylum: Arthropoda
- Clade: Pancrustacea
- Class: Insecta
- Order: Hymenoptera
- Family: Megachilidae
- Genus: Paranthidium
- Species: P. orizabae

Binomial name
- Paranthidium orizabae (Dalla Torre, 1890)

Synonyms
- Anthidium atriventre Smith, 1879 (Preocc.); Anthidium orizabae Dalla Torre, 1890

Species of bee

Paranthidium orizabae is a species of bee in the family Megachilidae, the leaf-cutter, carder, or mason bees.

== Distribution ==
Middle America
