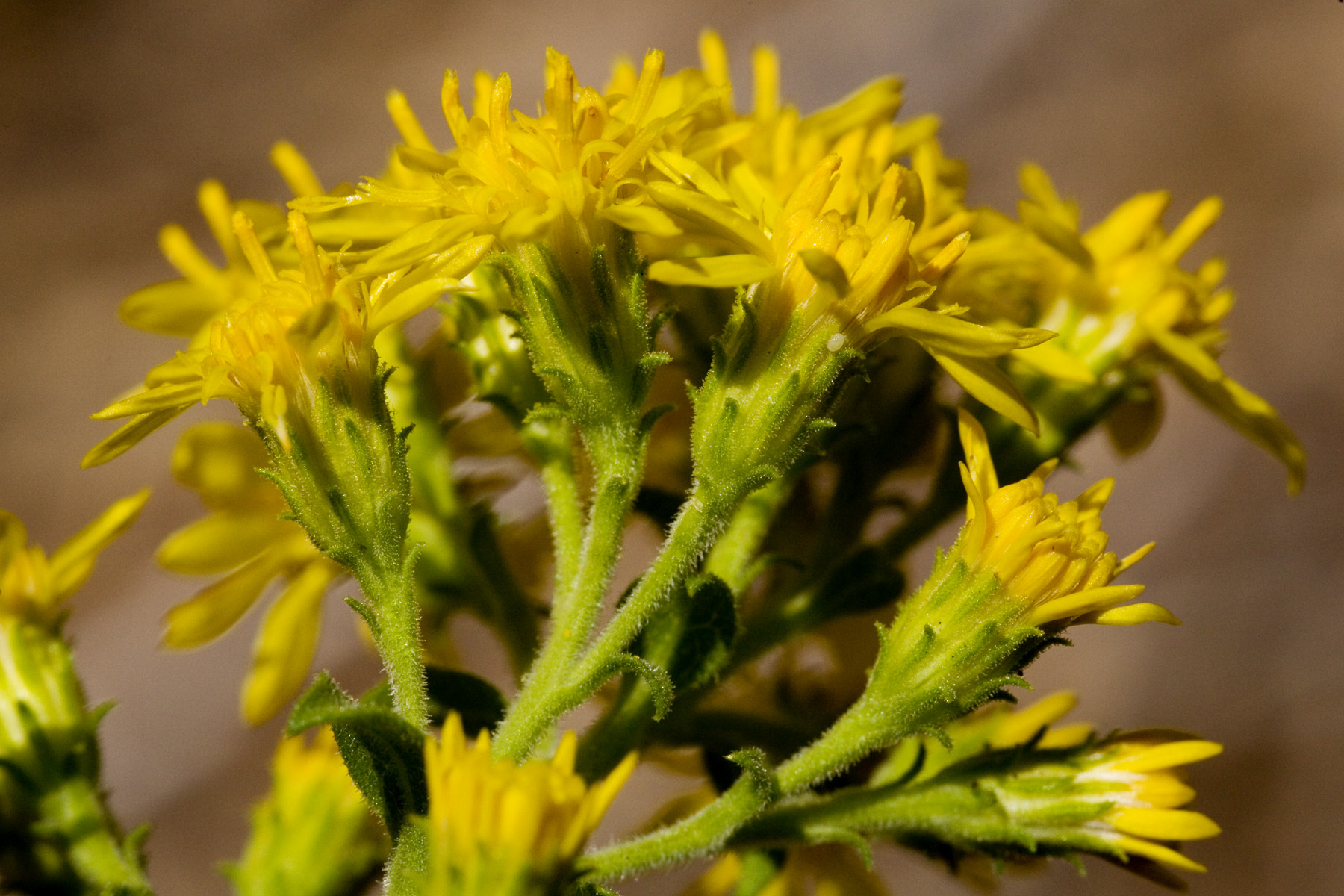

Conservation status
- Apparently Secure (NatureServe)

Scientific classification
- Kingdom: Plantae
- Clade: Tracheophytes
- Clade: Angiosperms
- Clade: Eudicots
- Clade: Asterids
- Order: Asterales
- Family: Asteraceae
- Genus: Solidago
- Species: S. wrightii

Binomial name
- Solidago wrightii A.Gray 1880

Synonyms
- Aster brittonii Kuntze; Solidago bigelovii A.Gray; Solidago bigelovii var. wrightii (A.Gray) A.Gray; Solidago wrightii var. adenophora S.F.Blake

= Solidago wrightii =

Species of plant

Solidago wrightii, commonly known as Wright's goldenrod, is a North American species of goldenrod in the family Asteraceae. It grows in northern Mexico (Chihuahua, Durango, Sonora, Coahuila) and the southwestern United States (Arizona, New Mexico, Colorado, western Texas, and the Oklahoma Panhandle).

Solidago wrightii is a perennial herb up to 110 cm (44 inches) tall, with a woody underground caudex and rhizomes. One plant can produce as many as 140 small yellow flower heads in a large, rounded array at the top of the plant.
