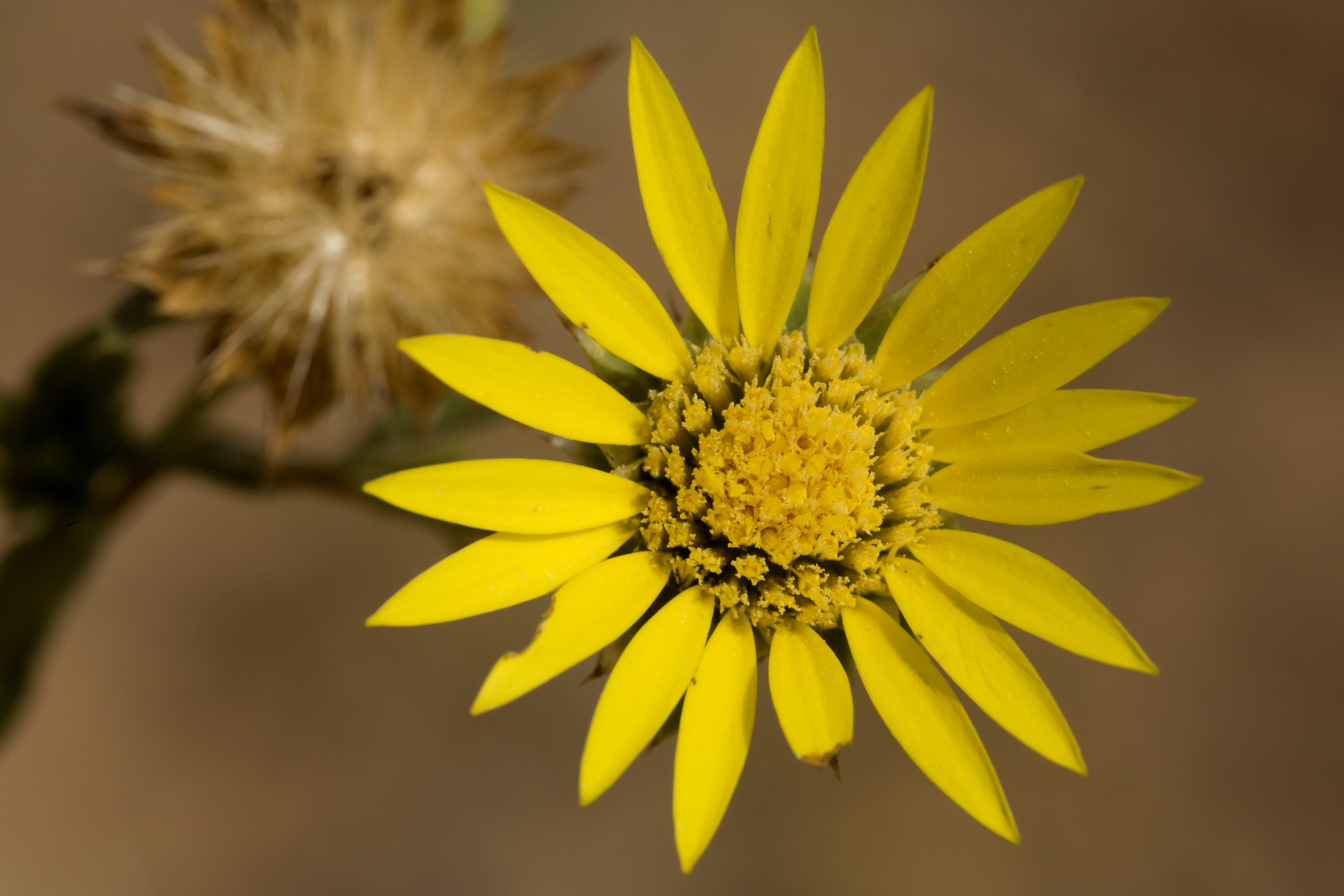

Scientific classification
- Kingdom: Plantae
- Clade: Embryophytes
- Clade: Tracheophytes
- Clade: Spermatophytes
- Clade: Angiosperms
- Clade: Eudicots
- Clade: Asterids
- Order: Asterales
- Family: Asteraceae
- Genus: Xanthisma
- Species: X. texanum

Binomial name
- Xanthisma texanum DC.

Synonyms
- Machaeranthera grandiflora Buckley; Xanthisma berlandieri Small; Xanthisma texanum f. texanum; Xanthisma texanum var. berlandieri A.Gray

= Xanthisma texanum =

Species of flowering plant

Xanthisma texanum (common names the Texas sleepydaisy, star-of-Texas, and Drummond's sleepy-daisy) is an ornamental plant native to the United States. This plant is usually propagated by seeds.
