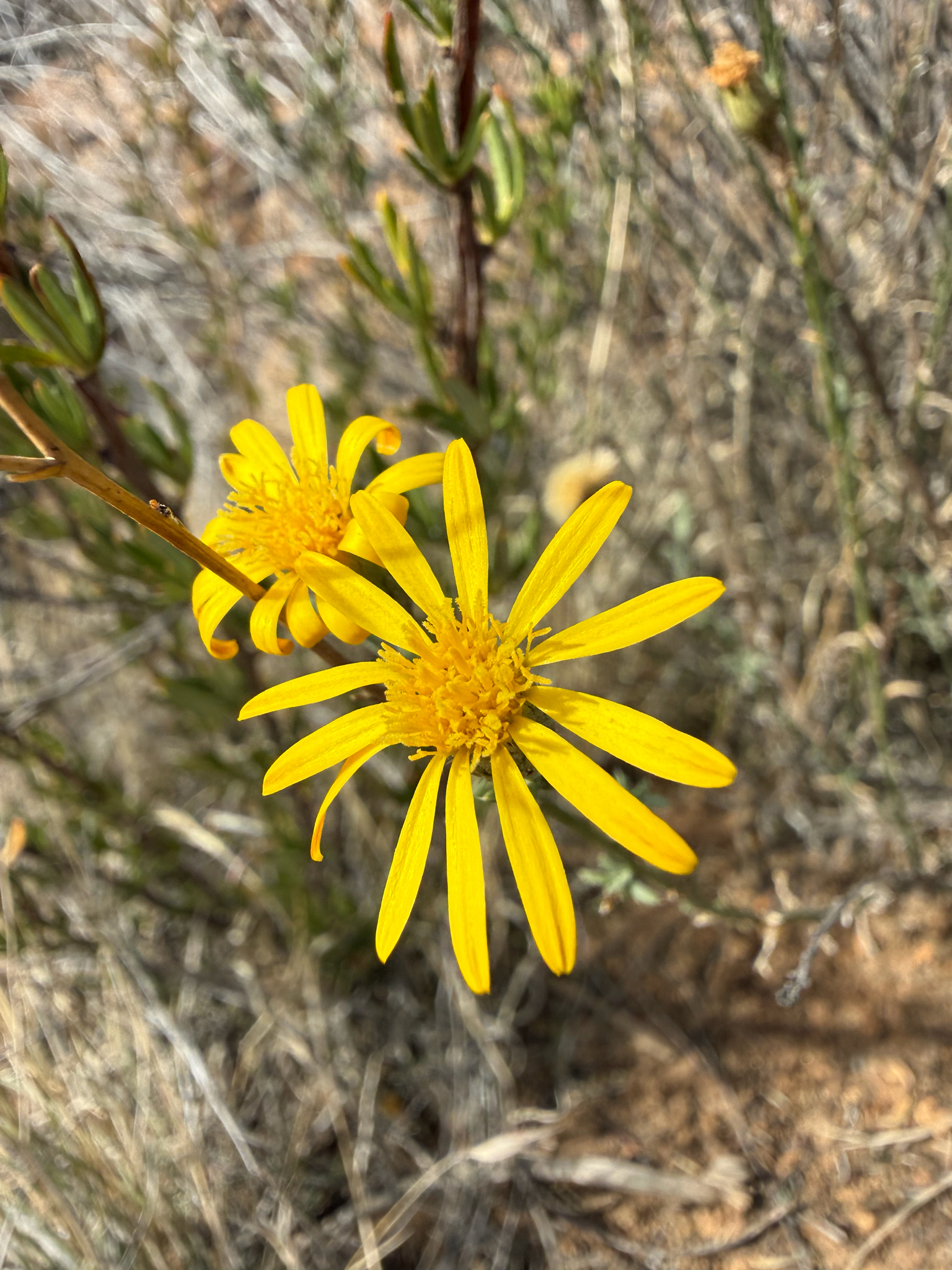

Conservation status
- Secure (NatureServe)

Scientific classification
- Kingdom: Plantae
- Clade: Embryophytes
- Clade: Tracheophytes
- Clade: Spermatophytes
- Clade: Angiosperms
- Clade: Eudicots
- Clade: Asterids
- Order: Asterales
- Family: Asteraceae
- Genus: Xanthisma
- Species: X. junceum

Binomial name
- Xanthisma junceum (Greene) D.R.Morgan & R.L.Hartm.

Synonyms
- Eriocarpum junceum (Greene) Greene; Haplopappus junceus Greene; Machaeranthera juncea (Greene) Shinners; Sideranthus junceus (Greene) Davidson & Moxley

= Xanthisma junceum =

Species of flowering plant

Xanthisma junceum is a species of flowering plant in the family Asteraceae known by the common names rush bristleweed or rush-like bristleweed. It is native to northern Mexico and it occurs in the United States only as far north as San Diego County, California. It grows in coastal and inland slopes and canyons. It is a perennial herb growing erect to 1 m in height. The linear leaves are mostly located at the base of the plant, each 1–2 cm long and toothed or cut into bristle-tipped lobes. The inflorescence bears one or more flower heads lined with glandular, bristle-tipped phyllaries. The head has a center of many yellow disc florets and a fringe of 15 to 25 yellow ray florets each about 1/2 cm long. The fruit is a hairy achene 2–3 mm long tipped with a pappus.
