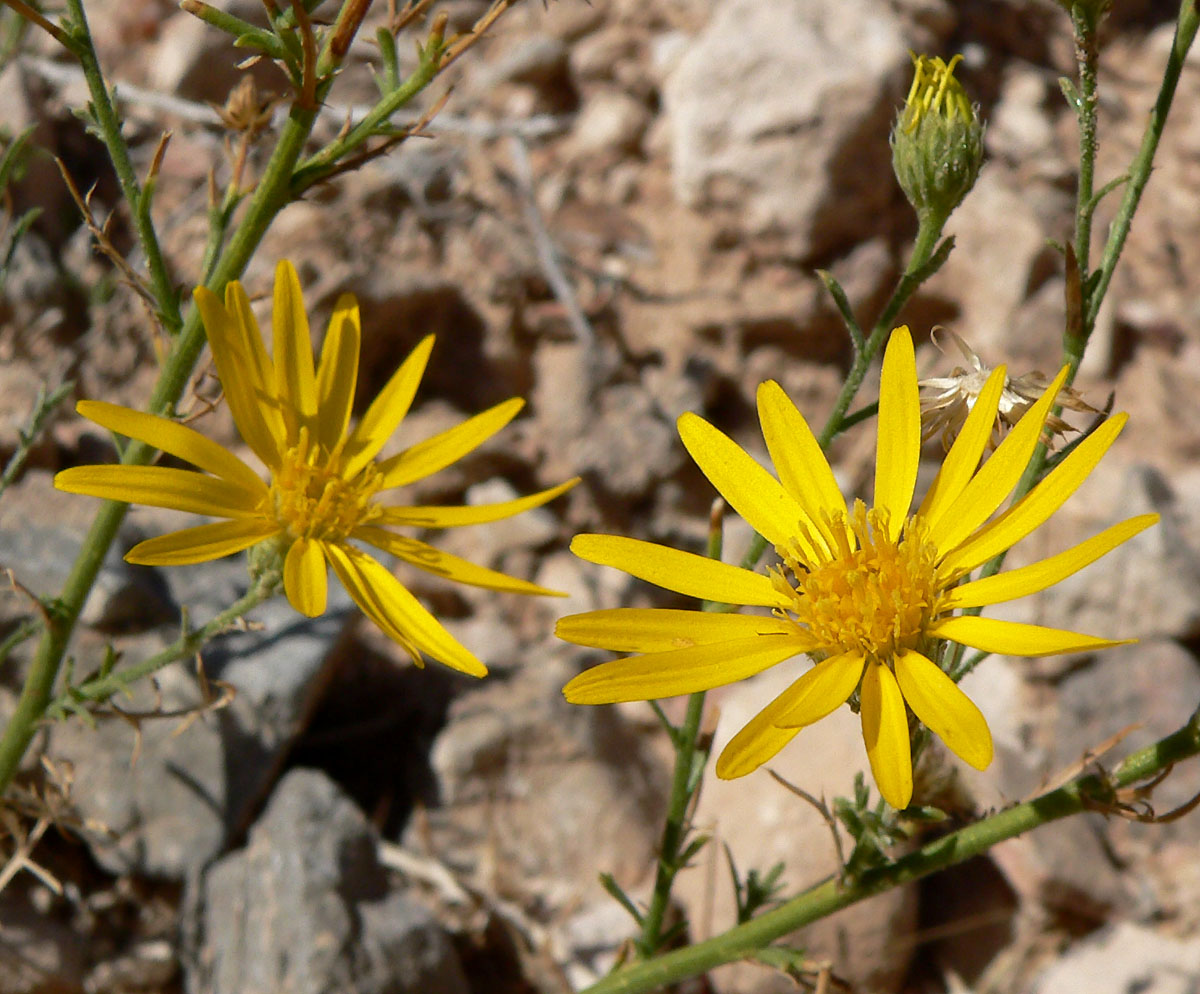
- Xanthisma spinulosum on Frenchman Mountain, Nevada

Scientific classification
- Kingdom: Plantae
- Clade: Tracheophytes
- Clade: Angiosperms
- Clade: Eudicots
- Clade: Asterids
- Order: Asterales
- Family: Asteraceae
- Subfamily: Asteroideae
- Tribe: Astereae
- Subtribe: Machaerantherinae
- Genus: Xanthisma; DC.

Type species
- Xanthisma texanum DC.

Synonyms
- Xanthisma sect. Sideranthus (Nutt. ex Nees) D.R.Morgan & R.L.Hartm.; Machaeranthera subg. Sideranthus (Nutt. ex Nees) R.L.Hartm.; Sideranthus Nutt. ex Nees; Centauridium Torr. & A.Gray; Machaeranthera sect. Sideranthus (Nutt. ex Nees) R.L.Hartm.; Machaeranthera sect. Stenoloba R.L.Hartm.; Sideranthus Nutt.; Eriocarpum Nutt.

= Xanthisma =

Genus of flowering plants

Xanthisma, common name sleepy-daisy, is a genus of flowering plants in the family Asteraceae.

The generic name comes from the Greek "xanthos" meaning "yellow" and "-ismos" meaning "condition". It was first described in 1836 from material collected in "The Mexican Province of Texas."

Species

- Xanthisma blephariphyllum (A.Gray) D.R.Morgan & R.L.Hartm. - TX NM
- Xanthisma coloradoense (A.Gray) D.R.Morgan & R.L.Hartm. - CO WY
- Xanthisma gracile (Nutt.) D.R.Morgan & R.L.Hartm. - CA NV UT CO AZ NM TX NY ME, Chihuahua
- Xanthisma grindelioides (Nutt.) D.R.Morgan & R.L.Hartm. - Alberta, Saskatchewan, MT ND SD NE WY CO UT AZ NV NM
- Xanthisma gypsophilum (B.L.Turner) D.R.Morgan & R.L.Hartm. - Coahuila, Durango, TX NM
- Xanthisma junceum (Greene) D.R.Morgan & R.L.Hartm. - Baja California, AZ CA
- Xanthisma paradoxum (B.L. Turner & R.L. Hartm.) G.L. Nesom & B.L. Turner - CO AZ UT
- Xanthisma spinulosum (Pursh) D.R.Morgan & R.L.Hartm. - Nuevo León, Coahuila, Alberta, Saskatchewan, Manitoba, CA AZ NM TX AR OK KS CO UT NV ID WY MT ND SD NE IA MN
- Xanthisma texanum DC. - TX NM AZ OK
- Xanthisma viscidum (Wooton & Standl.) D.R.Morgan & R.L.Hartm. - TX NM
