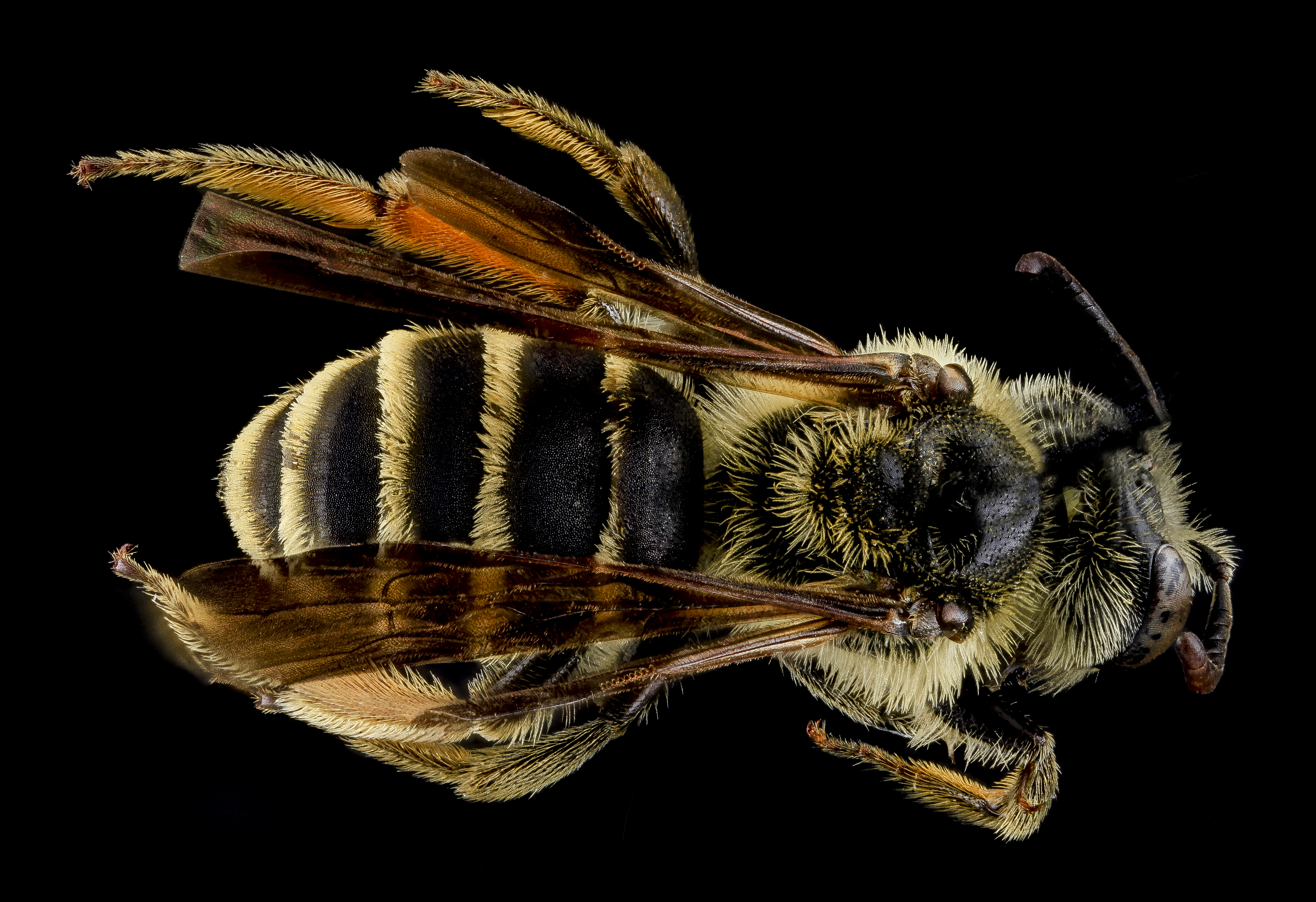

Scientific classification
- Domain: Eukaryota
- Kingdom: Animalia
- Phylum: Arthropoda
- Class: Insecta
- Order: Hymenoptera
- Family: Andrenidae
- Genus: Andrena
- Species: A. fulvipennis

Binomial name
- Andrena fulvipennis Smith, 1853

= Andrena fulvipennis =

Species of bee

Andrena fulvipennis is a species of mining bee in the family Andrenidae. It is found in North America.
