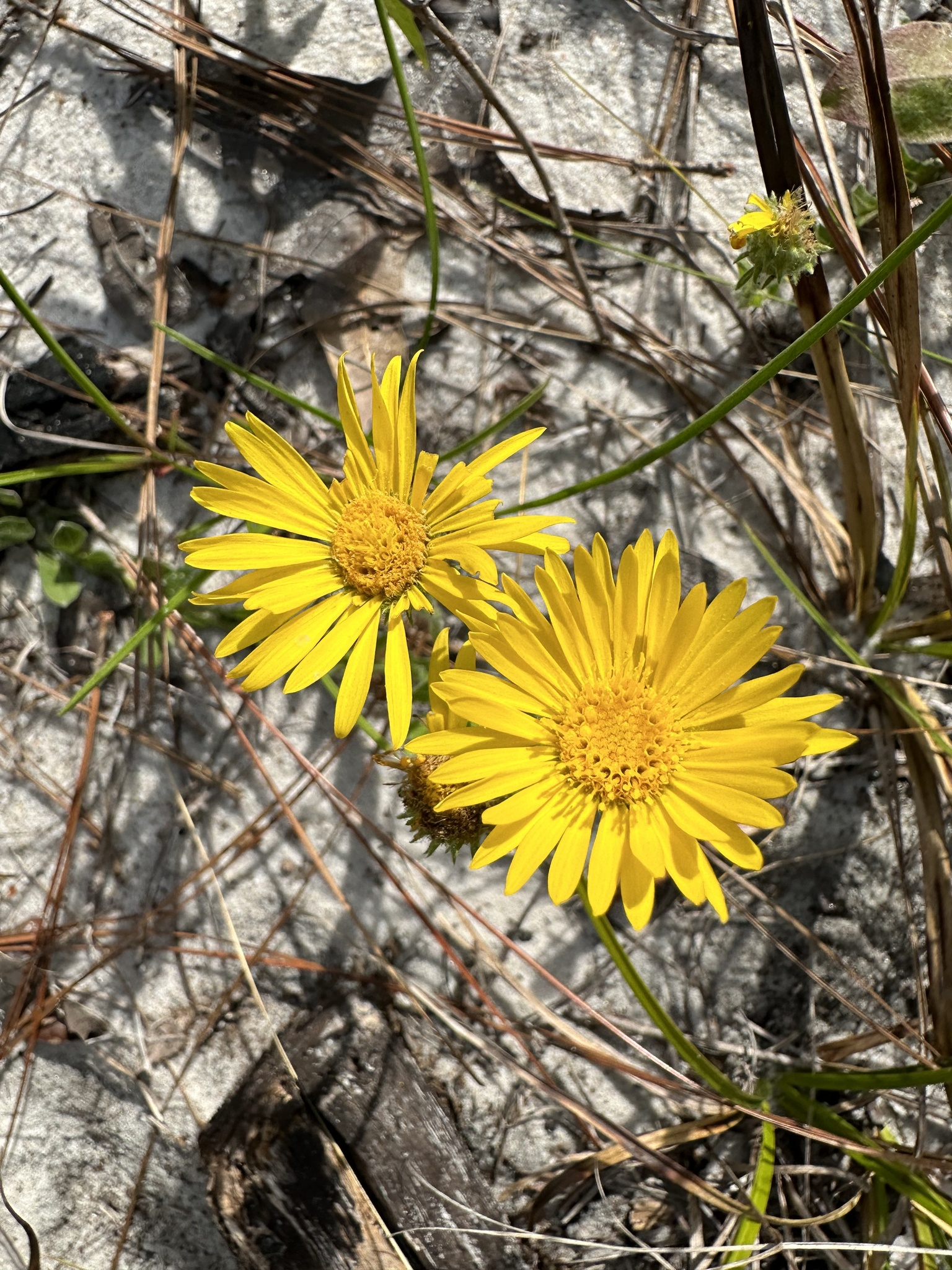
- Chrysopsis gossypina subsp. gossypina

Conservation status
- Secure (NatureServe)

Scientific classification
- Kingdom: Plantae
- Clade: Tracheophytes
- Clade: Angiosperms
- Clade: Eudicots
- Clade: Asterids
- Order: Asterales
- Family: Asteraceae
- Genus: Chrysopsis
- Species: C. gossypina

Binomial name
- Chrysopsis gossypina (Michx.) Elliott 1823 not Nutt. 1818

Synonyms
- Synonymy: Chrysopsis arenicola Alexander ex Small; Chrysopsis decumbens Chapm.; Chrysopsis dentata Elliott; Chrysopsis longii Fernald; Chrysopsis trichophylla (Nutt.) Elliott; Diplogon pilosum (Walter) Kuntze; Diplogon trichophyllum Kuntze; Diplopappus intermedius Cass.; Diplopappus lanatus Cass.; Diplopappus trichophyllus (Nutt.) Hook.; Erigeron pilosus Walter; Erigeron squarrosus Walter; Heterotheca gossypina (Michx.) Shinners; Heterotheca trichophylla (Nutt.) Shinners; Inula gossypina Michx.; Inula trichophylla Nutt.; Chrysopsis cruiseana Dress, syn of subsp. cruiseana; Heterotheca cruiseana (Dress) V.L.Harms, syn of subsp. cruiseana; Chrysopsis gigantea Small, syn of subsp. hyssopifolia; Chrysopsis hyssopifolia Nutt., syn of subsp. hyssopifolia; Chrysopsis mixta Dress, syn of subsp. hyssopifolia; Diplogon hyssopifolium (Nutt.) Kuntze, syn of subsp. hyssopifolia; Heterotheca hyssopifolia (Nutt.) R.W.Long, syn of subsp. hyssopifolia

= Chrysopsis gossypina =

Species of plant

Chrysopsis gossypina, the cottony goldenaster, is a North American species of flowering plant in the family Asteraceae. It is native to the Coastal Plain of the southeastern United States, from eastern Louisiana to southeastern Virginia.

Chrysopsis gossypina is a biennial or short-lived perennial up to 70 cm tall. One plant can produce as many as 30 small, yellow flower heads, each head with both ray florets and disc florets. The species can grow in a variety of habitats and sometimes hybridizes with related species.

Subspecies

- Chrysopsis gossypina subsp. cruiseana (Dress) Semple - coastal sand dunes in Florida + Alabama
- Chrysopsis gossypina subsp. gossypina - open areas from Florida to Virginia
- Chrysopsis gossypina subsp. hyssopifolia (Nutt.) Semple - Louisiana to Florida
