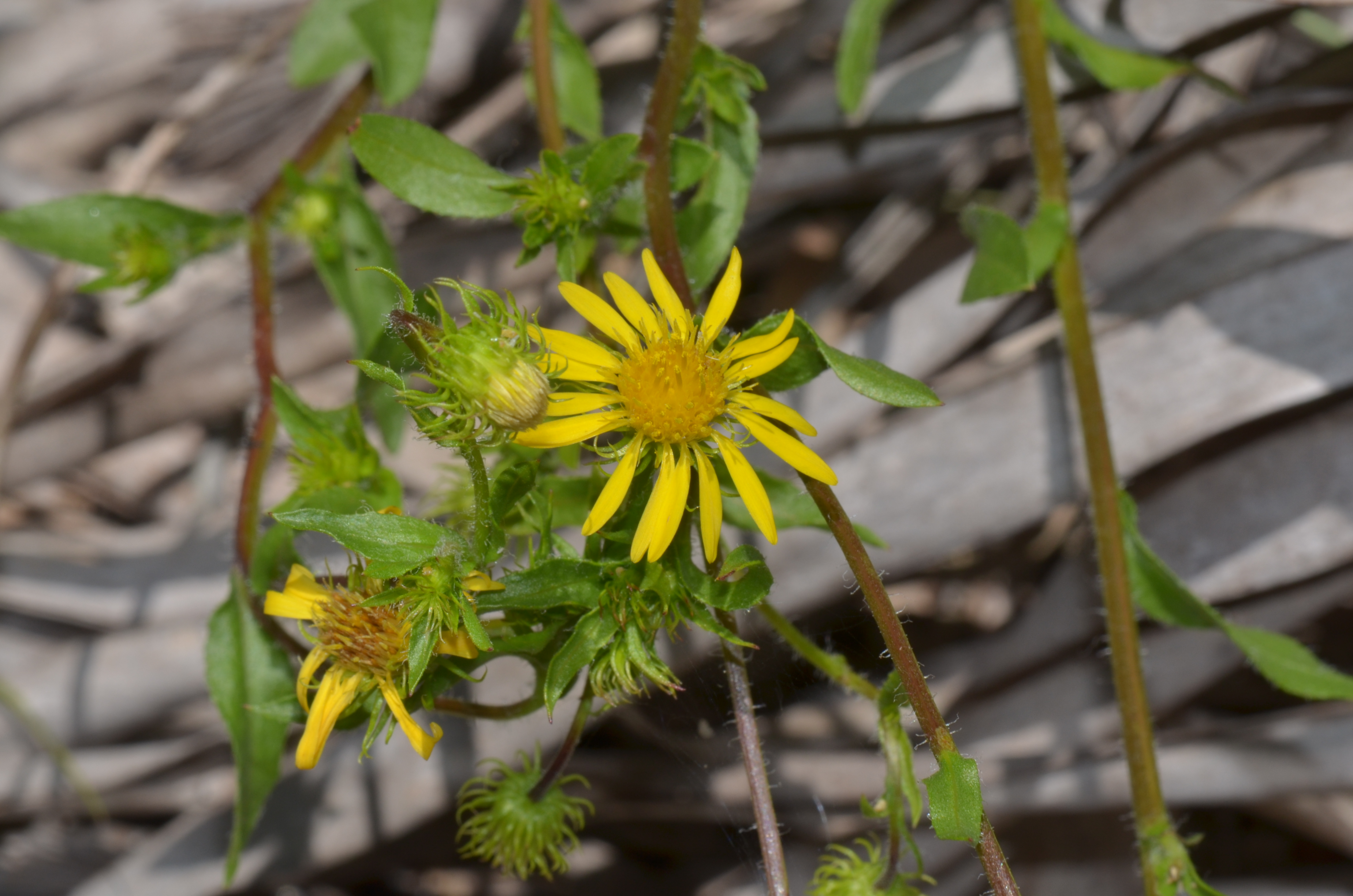

Conservation status
- Apparently Secure (NatureServe)

Scientific classification
- Kingdom: Plantae
- Clade: Tracheophytes
- Clade: Angiosperms
- Clade: Eudicots
- Clade: Asterids
- Order: Asterales
- Family: Asteraceae
- Genus: Chrysopsis
- Species: C. subulata

Binomial name
- Chrysopsis subulata Small

Synonyms
- Heterotheca hyssopifolia var. subulata (Small) R.W.Long; Heterotheca subulata (Small) V.L.Harms

= Chrysopsis subulata =

Species of plant

Chrysopsis subulata, called the scrubland goldenaster, is a North American species of flowering plant in the family Asteraceae. It has been found only in Florida.

Chrysopsis subulata is a biennial herb up to 70 cm (28 inches) tall. It generally produces 1-5 branching stems. Both the leaves and the stem are either hairless or with finely scattered hairs. Each stalk can produce as many as 70 yellow flower heads and a loose array. The species grows in sandy and grassy locations.
