= Paranthidium jugatorium =

Scientific classification
- Kingdom: Animalia
- Phylum: Arthropoda
- Clade: Pancrustacea
- Class: Insecta
- Order: Hymenoptera
- Family: Megachilidae
- Genus: Paranthidium
- Species: P. jugatorium

Binomial name
- Paranthidium jugatorium (Say, 1824)

Species of bee

Paranthidium jugatorium, also known as the sunflower burrowing-resin bee, is a species of bee in the family Megachilidae. It is found in Central America and North America.

== Subspecies ==
These four subspecies belong to the species Paranthidium jugatorium:

- Paranthidium jugatorium butleri Snelling, 1962
- Paranthidium jugatorium jugatorium (Say, 1824)
- Paranthidium jugatorium lepidum (Cresson, 1878)
- Paranthidium jugatorium perpictum (Cockerell, 1898)
