= John C. Semple =

American botanist (born 1947)

John Cameron Semple
- Born: 1947 (age 78–79); Boston, Massachusetts
- Education: Doctor of Philosophy
- Alma mater: Washington University in St. Louis (MA 1971, PhD 1972); Tufts University (BSc 1969)
- Known for: Cytology, morphology, phylogeny, and nomenclature of members of the tribe Astereae
- Children: 3
- Scientific career
- Fields: Botany (including cytotaxonomy)
- Workplaces: University of Waterloo
- Thesis: The Cytology, Flavonoid Chemistry and Systematics of the Texas Sleepy Daisy Xanthisma texanum DC. (Asteraceae) (1972)
- Doctoral students: Luc Brouillet
- Author abbrev. (botany): Semple
- Website: uwaterloo.ca/astereae-lab/

John Cameron Semple (born 1947) is a botanist, cytotaxonomist, professor emeritus, and adjunct professor at the University of Waterloo in Ontario, Canada. He was born in Boston and earned a degree of Bachelor of Science in 1969 from Tufts University, followed in 1971 and 1972 by Master of Arts and Doctor of Philosophy degrees from Washington University in St. Louis. Semple is known for his work with members of the tribe Astereae, particularly goldenrods, American asters, and goldenasters, and he maintains the University of Waterloo Astereae Lab website. Semple's wife is Brenda, and in 2013, he named a newly discovered goldenrod species Solidago brendiae in honor of her.

== Early life and education ==
John Cameron Semple was born in 1947 in Boston, the second child of three to Bob Semple, an accountant, and Margaret Semple, a school teacher. As a child, John had an interest in art and took classes in the subject at a local museum. In high school, he became interested in biology, and this led him to enroll in Tufts University in 1965 to begin the study of medicine. At the encouragement of a botany professor he met at Tufts, he included courses in botany and taxonomy in his studies and decided to attend graduate school to become a botanist.

After earning a Bachelor of Science in 1969 from Tufts, Semple enrolled at Washington University in St. Louis, spending most of his time at the Missouri Botanical Garden. In 1971 and 1972, he earned Master of Arts and Doctor of Philosophy degrees in biology with a focus on botany. His 1972 PhD dissertation was entitled The Cytology, Flavonoid Chemistry and Systematics of the Texas Sleepy Daisy Xanthisma texanum DC. (Asteraceae). Semple acquired a background in cytotaxonomy and evolutionary classification while performing this research, as well as an affinity toward the study of flowering plants in the family Asteraceae.

== Career ==
For post-doctoral studies, Semple remained at Washington University in St. Louis, also serving as a lecturer and visiting assistant professor, into the summer of 1974. Beginning that fall, he became a lecturer at the University of Waterloo, Ontario, Canada, where he spent his career and retired in 2012. One of Semple's early notable doctoral students was Canadian botanist Luc Brouillet.

The majority of Semple's post-retirement work has been focused on the goldenrod genus Solidago. In February 2021, he and botanist James B. Beck published a revision of the genus based on a large phylogenomic study. This revision can be viewed on Semple's website as well as in the original paper.

=== Awards ===
Semple received the COSEWIC Service Award from the Committee on the Status of Endangered Wildlife in Canada in 1998, and the John Goldie Award from the Field Botanists of Ontario in 2018.

== Personal life ==
Semple and his wife Brenda have three sons and several grandchildren.

== Selected publications ==
The standard author abbreviation Semple is used to indicate this person as the author when citing a botanical name. Semple has published over 220 works including several new species. A sampling of his work is listed here in chronological order.

- Semple, J.C.; Brouillet, L. (August 1980a). "A Synopsis of North American Asters: The Subgenera, Sections and Subsections of Aster and Lasallea". American Journal of Botany. 67 (7). St. Louis, Missouri: Botanical Society of America: 1010–1026. doi:10.2307/2442193. eISSN 1537-2197. ISSN 0002-9122. JSTOR 2442193. LCCN 17005518. OCLC 475054649 – via ResearchGate.
- Semple, J.C.; Brouillet, L. (August 1980b). "Chromosome Numbers and Satellite Chromosome Morphology in Aster and Lasallea". American Journal of Botany. 67 (7). St. Louis, Missouri: Botanical Society of America: 1027–1039. doi:10.2307/2442194. eISSN 1537-2197. ISSN 0002-9122. JSTOR 2442194. LCCN 17005518. OCLC 475054649 – via ResearchGate.
- Semple, J.C.; Brammall, R.A. (November 1982). "Wild Aster lanceolatus × lateriflorus Hybrids in Ontario and Comments on the Origin of A. ontarionis (Compositae-Astereae)". Canadian Journal of Botany. 60 (10). Ottawa: Canadian Science Publishing: 1895–1906. doi:10.1139/b82-237.
- Semple, J.C.; Ringius, G.S.; Zhang, J. (1999). "The Goldenrods of Ontario: Solidago L. and Euthamia Nutt. 3rd Edition". University of Waterloo Biology Series. 39. Ontario: Department of Biology, University of Waterloo: 1–90.
- Semple, J.C.; Heard, S.B.; Brouillet, L. (2002). "Cultivated and Native Asters of Ontario (Compositae: Astereae): Aster L. (Including Asteromoea Blume, Diplactis Raf. and Kalimeris (Cass.) Cass.), Callistephus Cass., Galatella Cass., Doellingeria Nees, Oclemena E.L.Greene, Eurybia (Cass.) S.F.Gray, Canadanthus Nesom, and Symphyotrichum Nees (Including Virgulus Raf.)". University of Waterloo Biology Series. 41. Ontario: 1–134.
- Chmielewski, J.G.; Semple, J.C. (October 2003). "The Biology of Canadian Weeds. 125. Symphyotrichum ericoides (L.) Nesom (Aster ericoides L.) and S. novae-angliae (L.) Nesom (A. novae-angliae L.)". Canadian Journal of Plant Science. 83 (4). Ottawa: Canadian Science Publishing: 1017–1037. doi:10.4141/P01-179. eISSN 1918-1833. ISSN 0008-4220.
- Hood, J.L.A.; Semple, J.C. (22 December 2003). "Pappus Variation in Solidago (Asteraceae: Astereae)". SIDA, Contributions to Botany. 20 (4). Botanical Research Institute of Texas: 1617–1630. JSTOR 41961022 – via Biodiversity Heritage Library.
- Semple, J.C.; Hood, J.L.A. (21 December 2005). "Pappus Variation in North American Asters. I. Double, Triple and Quadruple Pappus in Symphyotrichum and Related Aster Genera (Asteraceae: Astereae)". SIDA, Contributions to Botany. 21 (4). Botanical Research Institute of Texas: 2141–2159. JSTOR 41968510 – via Biodiversity Heritage Library.
- Semple, J.C. (2 April 2013). "On the Name Solidago mirabilis (Asteraceae: Astereae) and a New Name for a Japanese Species of Goldenrod" (PDF). Phytoneuron. 2013 (24). Fort Worth, Texas: Guy L. Nesom: 1–9. ISSN 2153-733X. LCCN 2010202919. OCLC 540632713.
- Semple, J.C.; Peirson, J.A. (1 July 2013). "A Revised Nomenclature for the Solidago simplex Complex (Asteraceae: Astereae)" (PDF). Phytoneuron. 2013 (41). Fort Worth, Texas: Guy L. Nesom: 1–5. ISSN 2153-733X. LCCN 2010202919. OCLC 540632713.
- Semple, J.C. (21 August 2013a). "A New Species of Triplinerviae Goldenrod in Eastern Canada (Asteraceae: Astereae): Solidago brendiae" (PDF). Phytoneuron. 2013 (57). Fort Worth, Texas: Guy L. Nesom: 1–9. ISSN 2153-733X. LCCN 2010202919. OCLC 540632713.
- Semple, J.C.; Faheemuddin, H.; Chong, Y.A.; Sorour, M.K.; Hood, J.A.; Khamis, I.; Ma, Y.; Kornobis, K. (21 August 2013). "A Multivariate Morphometric Study of the Solidago canadensis/S. lepida Complex of Solidago subsect. Triplinerviae (Asteraceae: Astereae)" (PDF). Phytoneuron. 2013 (58). Fort Worth, Texas: Guy L. Nesom: 1–20. ISSN 2153-733X. LCCN 2010202919. OCLC 540632713.
- Semple, J.C.; Ohi-Toma, T. (22 February 2017). "Typification of Solidago yokusaiana (Asteraceae: Astereae) a Distinctive Japanese Species" (PDF). Phytoneuron. 2017 (16). Fort Worth, Texas: Guy L. Nesom: 1–6. ISSN 2153-733X. LCCN 2010202919. OCLC 540632713.
- Verloove, F.; Zonneveld, B.J.M.; Semple, J.C. (10 March 2017). "First Evidence for the Presence of Invasive Solidago altissima (Asteraceae) in Europe". Willdenowia. 47 (1). Botanic Garden and Botanical Museum Berlin: 69–75. doi:10.3372/wi.47.47107. JSTOR 26603071 – via ResearchGate.
- Semple, J.C. (16 October 2019). "Symphyotrichum estesii, a New Species of Virguloid Aster from Tennessee (Asteraceae: Astereae)" (PDF). Phytoneuron. 2019 (36). Fort Worth, Texas: Guy L. Nesom: 1–10. ISSN 2153-733X. LCCN 2010202919. OCLC 540632713.
- Semple, J.C.; Beck, J.B. (26 February 2021a). "Revised Infrageneric Classification of Solidago (Asteraceae: Astereae)" (PDF). Phytoneuron. 2021 (10). Fort Worth, Texas: Guy L. Nesom: 1–6. ISSN 2153-733X. LCCN 2010202919. OCLC 540632713.
- Semple, J.C. (13 September 2021d). "Astereae Lab – Classification and illustrations of goldenrods". Ontario: University of Waterloo. Archived from the original on 1 December 2021.
- Semple, J.C. (14 October 2021c). "Astereae Lab – Solidago Goldenrods". Ontario: University of Waterloo. Archived from the original on 1 December 2021.
