= Elisabeth Peveling =

German botanist

- Born: 31 March 1932; Blankenstein/Ruhr, Germany
- Died: 31 July 1993 (aged 61)
- Education: University of Münster
- Scientific career
- Fields: Botany, lichenology
- Workplaces: University of Münster

Elisabeth Peveling (31 March 1932 – 31 July 1993) was a German botanist. Her scientific research was largely specialized in the cytology and ultrastructure of lichens.

== Early life and education ==
Peveling was born on 31 March 1932 in Blankenstein/Ruhr. She studied botany, zoology, mathematics and physics at the universities of Münster, Innsbruck and Göttingen, earning a master's degree in 1958 and a PhD in 1960. Both of her theses dealt with karyology in the plant family Cucurbitaceae. She was a research assistant at the Botanical Institute in the University of Münster.

In the mid-1960s, Peveling did research in the USA that dealt with the use of electron microscopy, including transmission electron microscopy and scanning electron microscopy. In 1969, she completed her habilitation in Münster; her thesis was titled Die Feinstruktur vegetativer Flechtenthalli nach Untersuchungen mit dem Durchstrahlungs- und Oberflächen-Rastermikroskop ("Fine structure of vegetative lichen thalli investigated with scanning electron microscopy and transmission electron microscopy"). She was appointed professor at the Botanical Institute, a position she held until her sudden illness and death in 1993.

== Work and legacy ==
Peveling's primary research interest was cytology, including the ultrastructure of lichens and their photobionts. She published more than 60 research papers. One of her best-known publications was a chapter on fine structure in The Lichens (a popular 1973 textbook edited by Vernon Ahmadjian and Mason E. Hale). In 1986, Peveling organized "Progress and Problems in Lichenology in the Eighties", a scientific conference held in Münster. The conference, attended by more than 150 participants from 15 countries, was later considered the first International Lichenological Symposium. This is a major symposium that has been organized by the International Association for Lichenology every four years since then.

Peveling was quite involved in university administration at the University of Münster, and was on several occasions the dean and vice dean of the Biology Department, and was until her death dean of the Mathematics and Science Faculty. From 1979 to 1982 she was the first woman vice-rector and the Rector of the University of Münster. Peveling was posthumously nominated for an Acharius Medal for her contributions to lichenology. In his survey of influential lichenologists, Ingvar Kärnefelt called her "a fore-runner in that she succeeded in a scientific career and reached the highest academic rank in Germany during a time when women rarely even tried to compete for such positions".

== Selected publications ==
- Peveling, Elisabeth (1960). Licht- und elektronenmikroskopische Beiträge zur Karyologie von Cucumis sativus (Thesis) (in German). Münster. OCLC 720282958.
- Peveling, Elisabeth (1968). "Elektronoptische untersuchungen an flechten. I. Strukturveránderungen der algenzellen von Lecanora muralis (Schreber) Rabenh. ( = Placodium saxicolum (Nyl.) sec.Klem.) beim eindringen von pilzhyphen". Zeitschrift für Pflanzenphysiologie (in German). 59: 172–183.
- Peveling, Elisabeth (1973). "Fine structure". In Ahmadjian, Vernon; Hale, Mason E. (eds.). The Lichens. Academic Press. pp. 147–182. ISBN 978-0-323-14309-7.
- König, Joachim; Peveling, Elisabeth (1980). "Vorkommen von Sporopollenin in der Zellwand des Phycobionten Trebouxia". Zeitschrift für Pflanzenphysiologie. 98 (5): 459–464. doi:10.1016/S0044-328X(80)80199-1.
- Peveling, Elisabeth, ed. (1987). Progress and Problems in Lichenology in the Eighties: Proceedings of an international symposium held at the University of Münster, 16.-21.3. 1986. Bibliotheca Lichenologica. Vol. 25. Lubrecht & Cramer. pp. 1–497. ISBN 978-3-443-58004-9.
- Peveling, Elisabeth; Burg, Hermann; Tenberge, Klaus (1990). Beeinflussung des Blattwachstums durch Epibionten : Abschlußbericht zum Forschungsauftrag des Ministers für Umwelt, Raumordnung und Landwirtschaft des Landes NRW im Rahmen des Forschungsprogramms "Luftverunreinigung und Waldschäden". Forschungsberichte zum Forschungsprogramm des Landes Nordrhein-Westfalen "Luftverunreinigungen und Waldschäden" (in German). Vol. 15. Düsseldorf: Institut für Botanik und Botanischer Garten der Westfälischen Wilhlems-Universität, Münster. OCLC 256334174.
