= Ludger Kappen =

Ecophysiologist, botantist and lichenologist

- Born: March 9, 1935; Boppard am Rhein
- Education: University of Göttingen; University of Würzburg
- Known for: ecophysiology; lichenology
- Awards: Acharius Medal
- Scientific career
- Workplaces: University of Göttingen; University of Kiel
- Thesis: Heat, cold and desiccation resistance of ferns and their gametophytes. (Hitze-, Kälte und Austrocknungsresistenz von Farnen und ihren Gametophyten.) (1963)

Ludger Kappen is an ecophysiologist, botanist and lichenologist. He was director of the Botanic Institute and Botanical Garden at the University of Kiel, and chairman and director of the university's Polar Ecology Institute.

== Early life and education ==
Kappen studied within the biological sciences at Freiburg and Göttingen, and was awarded a doctorate in 1963 for his work on the effects of environmental stress on ferns.

== Career ==
Kappen's first academic post was at the Forest Botanical Institute of the University of Göttingen investigating cold tolerance in fir trees, grape vines, lichens and marine algae. In 1974 he gained his habilitation at University of Würzburg for his further research into the mechanisms of cold tolerance in plants. In 1981 he joined University of Kiel as the established professor of ecophysiology and director of the Botanic Institute, which included the university's botanical garden. In 1984 Kappen became the chair and director of the new Polar Ecology Institute at the university and in later years took on several other organisational roles. These included directing the Center for Ecosystem Research at the Bornhöveder lakes in Schleswig-Holstein from 1987. He retired in 2000 to become an emeritus professor at the university.

His research involved studying the effects of abiotic stress, especially cold, heat, drought and light on plants. He was particularly interested in the response of polar and tropical lichens to their habitats. His research took him to locations around the world including deserts, tropical rainforests and also seven expeditions to polar regions. During these visits he contributed to plant surveys and collected lichens as well as making ecophysiological observations. He also collected paleobotanical fossils and this collection is now in the Heimatverein Willershausen archives in Lower Saxony. He also studied aspects of photosynthesis in these stressful environments.

== Publications ==
Kappen is the author, co-author or editor of over 210 books and scientific publications. These include:

- Kappen, L. (1973): Response to extreme environments. In: Ahmadjian, V, Hale, M.E. (eds.) The Lichens Chapter III,10, p. 311 - 380.
- Kappen, L. (1985): Vegetation and ecology of ice-free areas of Northern Victoria Land, Antarctica. 1 The lichen vegetation of Birthday Ridge and an inland mountain. Polar Biology 4: 213 - 225.
- Kappen, L. (1988): Ecophysiological relationships in different climatic regions. In: Galun, M. (ed.), CRC Handbook of Lichenology Vol.2 p. 37 - 100. CRC Press, Boca Raton
- Kappen, L. (1993): Lichens in the Antarctic region. In: Friedmann, E.I. (ed.) Antarctic Microbiology p. 433 - 490. Wiley-Liss Inc., New York
- Sancho, L.G., Schulz, F., Schroeter, B., Kappen, L. (1999) Bryophyte and lichen flora of South Bay (Livingston Island: South Shetland Islands, Antarctica). Nova Hedwigia 68: 301-337
- Ludger Kappen, Fernando Valladares (2007) Opportunistic Growth and Desiccation Tolerance: The Ecological Success of Poikilohydrous Autotrophs in Functional Plant Ecology, second edition

== Honours and awards ==
In 1999 the Kappen Cliffs in the south edge of Kar Plateau on Scott Coast, Victoria Land, Antarctica were named after him by the New Zealand Geographic Board. In 2000 a festschrift was held for his retirement on the subject of the biology of lichens and mosses. In 2004 he was awarded the Acharius Medal by the International Association for Lichenology in recognition of his lifetime's work.
