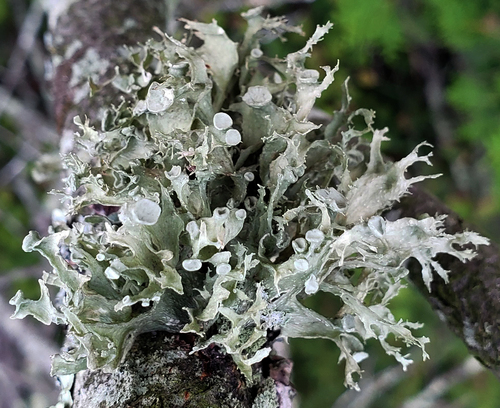

Scientific classification
- Kingdom: Fungi
- Division: Ascomycota
- Class: Lecanoromycetes
- Order: Lecanorales
- Family: Ramalinaceae
- Genus: Ramalina
- Species: R. sinensis

Binomial name
- Ramalina sinensis Jatta (1902)

Synonyms
- Desmazieria sinensis (Jatta) D.Hawksw. (1971)

= Ramalina sinensis =

Species of lichen-forming fungus

Ramalina sinensis is a species of fruticose lichen in the family Ramalinaceae. It is an erect, bushy lichen with broad, flattened branches that are greener above and paler beneath. The species is widespread across the Northern Hemisphere, occurring in North America, China, and Russia, where it grows on the bark of various trees. In Yunnan, it has a history of use as an edible lichen, prepared as a cold dish or cooked with pork.

== Taxonomy ==
Ramalina sinensis was described by Antonio Jatta in 1902 from material collected in China. In the protologue, he described it as a leaf-like lichen with a deeply veined thallus that may be somewhat net-ridged or perforated, and whose fertile lobes become rigid and fan-shaped. He also recorded terminal apothecia (fruiting bodies), colourless one-septate spores, and a smaller variety, elegantula.

A 2012 molecular phylogenetics study using internal transcribed spacer and mitochondrial small-subunit sequence data recovered Ramalina sinensis as a strongly supported monophyletic species. The sampled material from Canada, China, and the United States formed a single clade, indicating that the species is genetically coherent across a broad geographic range despite variation in thallus size and form.

In North America, the species is commonly known as the "fan ramalina", or the "burning bush".

== Description ==
Ramalina sinensis is an erect fruticose lichen attached by a narrow holdfast. Its lobes are broad, flattened, and often palmately divided, with a greener upper surface and a paler whitish underside, giving the thallus a distinctly two-sided appearance. The branches are solid rather than hollow, the lower surface bears sunken net-like pseudocyphellae, and apothecia are often produced near the tips. Its ascospores are small (5 μm long and 2.5 μm wide), spindle-shaped, and slightly curved.

== Habitat and distribution ==
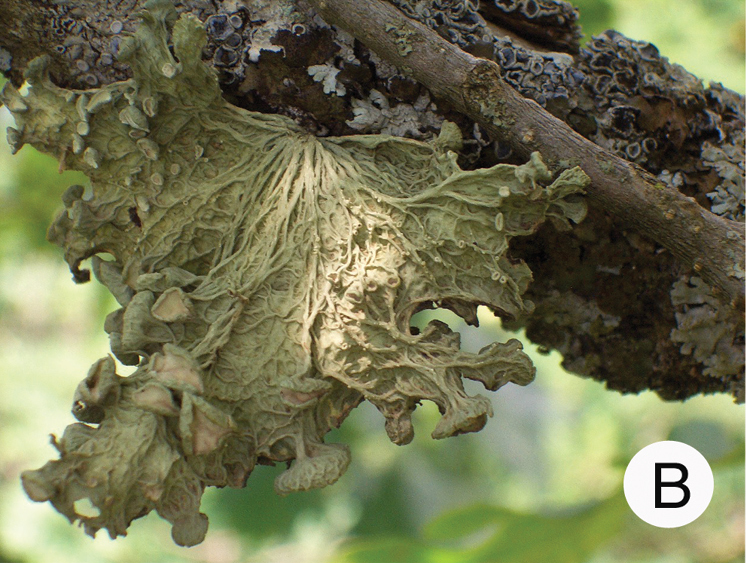
Thallus of Ramalina sinensis from Armenia, showing the pale, strongly veined lower surface

Ramalina sinensis is widespread across the Northern Hemisphere, but it often occurs as small, scattered local populations. In the Canadian prairies it has been reported as uncommon, especially in dry sandy habitats. In southern Manitoba, material studied in 2012 was collected in Sandilands Provincial Forest, Spruce Woods Provincial Park, and Whiteshell Provincial Park, where the lichen grew on ash, poplar, oak, spruce, and pincherry shrubs. In southwestern China, R. sinensis has been recorded from Sichuan, Tibet, and Yunnan, where it grows on bark in montane habitats at elevations of about 1,800–4,300 m. It is also widespread in the mountainous forests of North China.

In Russia's Altai Territory, R. sinensis is regarded as a quite rare species on the Salair Ridge. There it occurs mostly in valley willow forests, Picea obovata forests, and communities dominated by Abies sibirica and Tilia sibirica, growing on the bark of Populus tremula, Salix, Tilia sibirica, Abies sibirica, and Picea obovata, usually 1–5 m above the ground.

== Photobiont and population genetics ==
A 2012 study examined 23 specimens of Ramalina sinensis from southern Manitoba by sequencing the internal transcribed spacer region of both the fungal partner and its algal photobiont. The fungal sequences showed no clear geographic separation among the sampled regions, and the algal partner also lacked a consistent regional pattern. The photobiont was most similar to species of Trebouxia, especially T. impressa and T. potteri, and 12 algal haplotypes were recognized among the Manitoba collections.

== Ecology ==
Because Ramalina sinensis forms apothecia but lacks vegetative propagules, it is thought to disperse chiefly by sexual spores, which must later re-associate with a compatible alga. This may help explain the species' broad overall range and the weak geographic pattern in its populations, while the absence of vegetative propagules may also contribute to its local rarity in places such as Manitoba.

In the Qinling Mountains of Shaanxi, Ramalina sinensis has been recorded as a seasonal food of the golden snub-nosed monkey (Rhinopithecus roxellana). Together with Parmelia species, it formed an important part of the monkeys' winter diet; during that season the monkeys ate lichens much more heavily than in summer.

== Biomonitoring ==
In 2024, Ramalina sinensis was used as an active biomonitor of atmospheric element deposition in Tangshan, a heavily industrialized city in North China. Transplanted thalli exposed during the winter heating period accumulated higher concentrations of almost all tested elements than unexposed material, and subsequent work suggested that the species is most effective as a biomonitor over exposure periods of about 2–4 months, with most bioaccumulation occurring in the first two months.

== Human uses ==
In Yunnan, Ramalina sinensis has been used as an edible lichen by Yi, Dai, Han, and other local communities. Together with Ramalina conduplicans, it is cooked to prepare a traditional cold dish, and in some parts of southern Yunnan this dish is served at marriage banquets. The lichen is typically boiled, soaked in fresh water, and then eaten with seasonings; in some places it is also cooked with pork. Dried lichen material was sold in public markets in Yunnan, where it could be bought for culinary use. In market samples, Ramalina sinensis was often mixed with R. conduplicans, and local sellers did not usually distinguish between the two species.

== See also ==
- List of Ramalina species
