= Allan Green (botanist) =

New Zealand lichenologist

Allan Green NZAM
- Born: Thomas George Allan Green; United Kingdom
- Education: University of Oxford
- Awards: Acharius Medal
- Scientific career
- Fields: Lichenology
- Workplaces: Botanical Research Institute of Texas
- Thesis: The biology of lichen symbionts (1970)
- Doctoral advisors: David Cecil Smith

Thomas George Allan Green NZAM is a lichenologist, terrestrial ecologist and botanist. He is a professor emeritus at the University of Waikato, Hamilton, New Zealand. His work particularly studies how lichens respond to extreme low temperatures and dryness, and especially how this affects photosynthesis. He has studied the ecology of Antarctica.

== Early life and education ==
Green was born in the United Kingdom and studied lichens for his PhD at University of Oxford that was awarded in 1970. His supervisor was David Cecil Smith.

== Career ==
Green moved to University of Waikato in 1974, and has continued to work there throughout his career. By 2022 he held an emeritus professor position. He has long-standing collaborations in Spain and Germany, and he also works with scientists at research stations in Antarctica. His research focuses on the physiology of lichens and especially how they respond to their environment, particularly extreme dry and cold environments. He has made extensive studies of the lichens that live in the Antarctic as well as those living in alpine and arid regions. One of the partners in a lichen symbiosis is always a phototroph and his research has provided insight into the process and control of carbon dioxide fixation in lichens, especially in relation to the water content of the lichen.

== Honours and awards ==
In 2012, Green was awarded the DSc degree from University of Oxford. In the 2013 Queen's Birthday Honours, he was awarded the New Zealand Antarctic Medal, for services to Antarctic research. In 2016, he was awarded the Acharius Medal from the International Association for Lichenology for his lifetime contribution to lichenology.

== Publications ==
Green is the author or co-author of over 100 scientific publications, books and book chapters and many more conference papers. Some of the most significant are:

- Collins, Gemma E., Hogg, Ian D., Convey, Peter, Sancho, Leopoldo G., Cowan, Don A., Lyons, W. Berry, Adams, Byron J., Wall, Diana H., Green, T. G. Allan (2021) Genetic diversity of soil invertebrates corroborates timing estimates for past collapses of the West Antarctic Ice Sheet. Proceedings of the National Academy of Sciences (United States of America) 117 (36) pp 22293–22302
- Frieda L. Henskens, T. G. Allan Green and Alistair Wilkins (2012) Cyanolichens can have both cyanobacteria and green algae in a common layer as major contributors to photosynthesis. Annals of Botany 110 (3) pp 555–563.
- Green, T. G. Allan, Sancho, Leopoldo G., Pintado, Ana, Schroeter, Burkhard (2011) Functional and spatial pressures on terrestrial vegetation in Antarctica forced by global warming. Polar Biology 34 (11) pp 1643–1656
- Allan Green, T. G., Sancho, Leopoldo G., Pintado, Ana (2011) Ecophysiology of Desiccation/Rehydration Cycles in Mosses and Lichens. in Plant desiccation tolerance, Book series Ecological Studies: Analysis and Synthesis volume 215 pp 89–120
- Sancho, Leopoldo G., Green, T. G. Allan, Pintadoa, Ana (2007) Slowest to fastest: Extreme range in lichen growth rates supports their use as an indicator of climate change in Antarctica. Flora 202 (8) pp 667 – 673
- Otto L. Lange, T.G. Allan Green, Ulrich Heber (2001) Hydration-dependent photosynthetic production of lichens: what do laboratory studies tell us about field performance? Journal of Experimental Botany 52 (363) pp 2033–2042
- I. R. Cowan, O. L. Lange & T. G. A. Green (1992) Carbon-dioxide exchange in lichens: determination of transport and carboxylation characteristics. Planta 187 pp 282–294
- Lange, O. L., Green, T. G. A., Ziegler H. (1988) Water status related photosynthesis and carbon isotope discrimination in species of the lichen genus Pseudocyphellaria with green or blue-green photobionts and in photosymbiodemes. Oecologia 75 (4) pp 494 – 501
