= Margalith Galun =

Israeli lichenologist

- מרגלית גלון
- Born: Melitta Katz; 21 February 1927; Vienna, Austria
- Died: 16 April 2012 (aged 85)
- Occupation: lichenologist
- Years active: 1961–2006

Margalith Galun (Hebrew: מרגלית גלון; 21 February 1927 – 16 April 2012) was an Israeli lichenologist. She was a member of the Israel Academy of Sciences and Humanities and established the Israeli collection of lichens at Tel Aviv University. Founder of the academic journal Symbiosis, she served as its editor-in-chief between 1985 and 2006. In 1994, she was awarded the Acharius Medal and in 1996 won the Meitner-Humboldt Prize, for her contributions to the field. The International Association for Lichenology grants an award which bears her name to honor scholarship at their quadrennial symposium.

== Early life ==
Melitta Katz was born on 21 February 1927 in Vienna, Austria to Amalia (née Teitelbaum) and Arie Katz. Originally from Lviv, her father was a merchant and was involved in the Zionist and socialist movements. After completing her elementary school in Vienna and beginning her gymnasium studies, her family decided to immigrate in 1938. They were unsuccessful in leaving Austria and to get their daughter out of the country Melitta was adopted by a Jewish-Swiss family, changing her name to Margalith, in 1939. Her parents were eventually able to join their daughter in Switzerland and in October of that year, the family immigrated to Palestine. In Tel Aviv, Katz completed her secondary studies at Herzliya Hebrew Gymnasium in 1946, and went to live and work at the kibbutz of Kfar Giladi for several months. When her mother died, she returned to Tel Aviv to be with her father and enrolled in courses at the Hebrew University of Jerusalem in 1947.

Within a month, the 1947–1949 Palestine war began and Katz interrupted her studies to join the Israel Defense Forces. When the conflict ended in 1949, she returned to her classes and completed her undergraduate degree in 1952, going on to earn a master's degree in botany in 1954. She worked as a teaching assistant during her master's studies and in 1953 married Esra Galun. Her son Eithan was born in 1954 and that year she began working on her PhD at Hebrew University, simultaneously working as a research assistant at the Volcani Agriculture Institute in Rehovot. In 1959, her second son Ehud was born and the following year, she completed her dissertation Die Flechten im Negev, Israel (The lichens in the Negev, Israel) under the direction of Israel Reichart, earning her PhD.

== Career ==
Joining her husband in Pasadena, California, Galun conducted research at the California Institute of Technology from 1961 to 1962. Returning to Rehovot, she was employed at the Israel Institute for Biological Research in Ness Ziona from 1962 to 1965, receiving a research grant from the Israel Academy of Sciences and Humanities. In 1965, she was hired as a lecturer in the botany department at Tel Aviv University. She worked her way up the ladder, being promoted to senior lecturer in 1969, associate professor in 1971, and to professor in 1977. In addition to serving as department chair and on various departmental committees, she served as Dean of Students from 1977 to 1980, as a member of the Admissions Committee from 1978 to 1985; on the Board of Directors from 1989–1992, as well as other administrative positions. She also served on the Scientific Council at the Institute of Nature Conservation between 1988 and 1991.

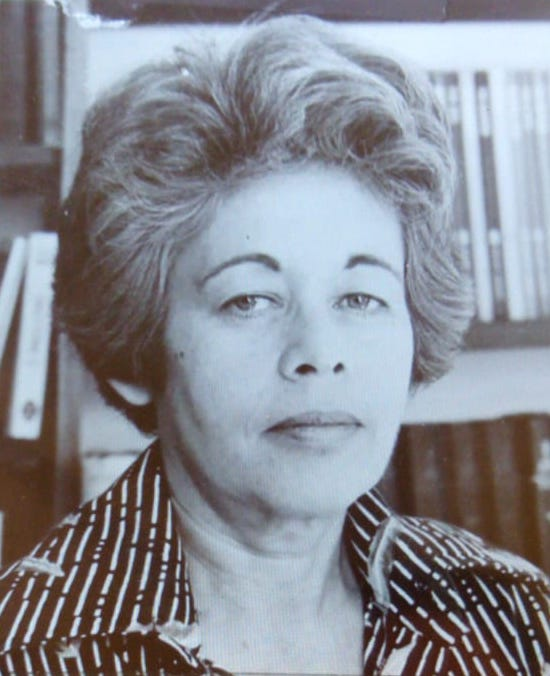
Margalith Galun around 1985

Simultaneously with her teaching, Galun conducted research on lichens. Establishing a research group, Galun led her students to collect samples and create the collection of lichens from throughout Israel for the university. Eventually their collection became international, including samples from many other countries. Initially her own research focused on identifying the varieties of lichen in Israel, but soon turned her attention to vegetative tissue, or thallus, to evaluate the interaction between algae and fungus during its formation. Studying the signalling molecules with electron microscopy, she wrote over 90 papers about lichen symbiosis and the absorption of metals by lichens, becoming "recognized as one of the world's foremost lichenologists".

In 1985, Galun founded the academic journal Symbiosis and served as its editor-in-chief from 1985 to 2006. Between 1987 and 1993, she was the vice president of the International Association for Lichenology and during her term organized the first International Symbiosis Congress held in Jerusalem in 1991. She served as editor for the three volume work Handbook of Lichenology (CRC Press, 1988), which gave an encyclopedic overview of the research and discoveries in the field from Simon Schwendener's pioneering work to the present date. In 1994, Galun was the recipient of the Acharius Medal presented by the International Association for Lichenology and in 1996, she was awarded the Meitner-Humboldt Prize from the Alexander von Humboldt Foundation.

== Death and legacy ==
Galun died on 16 April 2012 after a lengthy illness. An annual award bearing her name was initiated in 2012 by the International Association for Lichenology to be given to the outstanding student presenter at the organization's quadrennial symposium.
