= Cladonia trassii =

Scientific classification
- Domain: Eukaryota
- Kingdom: Fungi
- Division: Ascomycota
- Class: Lecanoromycetes
- Order: Lecanorales
- Family: Cladoniaceae
- Genus: Cladonia
- Species: C. trassii

Binomial name
- Cladonia trassii Ahti (1998)

Species of lichen

Cladonia trassii is a species of fruticose lichen in the family Cladoniaceae. It has a circumpolar distribution and is found in arctic/alpine and subarctic habitats.

== Taxonomy ==
Cladonia trassii was formally described as a new species in 1998 by Finnish lichenologist Teuvo Ahti. In a revision of the arctic lichen Cladonia stricta, he divided it into three distinct species based on morphological and chemical differences between them; Cladonia trassii was one of the new species, in addition to Cladonia uliginosa and C. stricta. The species epithet trassii honours Estonian lichenologist Hans Trass.

The type specimen of Cladonia trassii was collected on Mt. Patjanen (Gällivare, Lapland, Sweden) at an elevation of 550 m (1,800 ft). Ahti notes that the taxon is a new name for a species that Edvard Vainio originally called Cladonia cerasphora in 1894 and 1922 publications.

== Description ==
The thallus of Cladonia trassii comprises a primary thallus made of squamules measuring 1–5 mm wide, and a secondary thallus consisting of variably shaped podetia that are 3–8 cm (1.2–3.1 in) tall, and 1–3 mm (0.04–0.12 in) thick. The ascospores are spindle-shaped (fusiform) and measure 12–14 by 2.5–3 um.

The lichen product that occur in Cladonia trassii are atranorin and fumarprotocetraric acid as major metabolites, and minor amounts of protocetraric acid and confumarprotocetraric acid. The expected results of standard chemical spot tests are PD+ (red), and K+ (yellow).

== Habitat and distribution ==
Cladonia trassii is found in arctic/alpine and subarctic habitats. It has a circumpolar distribution in the northern hemisphere. Documented collection locations include Khabarovsk Krai, Russian Far East; Alaska, United States; Northwest Territories and Québec, Canada; and Greenland.

== See also ==
- List of Cladonia species
