= William Alfred Weber =

American botanist (1918–2020)

- Born: November 16, 1918; New York City, New York, U.S.
- Died: March 18, 2020 (aged 101); Longmont, Colorado, U.S.
- Education: Iowa State (B.S. of Botany 1940, M.A. of Botany 1942); Washington State (PhD. 1946)
- Known for: collecting flowering plants, mosses, and lichens from every continent except Africa
- Scientific career
- Fields: Botany; Lichenology
- Workplaces: University of Colorado Boulder; University of Colorado Museum of Natural History
- Doctoral students: D. D. Awasthi
- Author abbrev. (botany): W.A.Weber

William Alfred Weber (November 16, 1918 – March 18, 2020) was an American botanist and lichenologist. He was Professor Emeritus at the University of Colorado at Boulder and former curator of the University of Colorado Museum Herbarium (Index Herbariorum designation COLO).

== Biography ==
William Alfred Weber was born on November 16, 1918, and grew up in New York City.

He earned his master's in 1942 and PhD in 1945, both at Washington State University and began teaching at Colorado in 1946. Weber was well known for editing the exsiccata series Lichenes exsiccati distributed by the University of Colorado Museum, William A. Weber, Curator (1961–1988).

In 2018 he was awarded a lifetime achievement award from the American Bryological and Lichenological Society (ABLS). He died on March 18, 2020, in Longmont, Colorado.

== Honors and awards ==
- 2018 Acharius Medal of the International Association for Lichenology
- 2018 Elizabeth Britton Award for Lifetime Achievement in Bryology and the Chicita Culberson Award for Lifetime Achievement in Lichenology of the American Bryological and Lichenological Society.

The New Guinean lichen species Peltigera weberi Sérus., Goffinet, Miądl. & Vitik. was named in his honour in 2009.

== Selected publications ==
- Weber, W. A. 1946. A taxonomic and cytological study of the Wyethia, family Compositae, with notes on the related genus Balsamorhiza. Amer. Midl. Nat. 35:400-452.
- Weber, W. A. 1950. Recent additions to the flora of Colorado. Univ. Colorado Stud., Ser. Biol. 1:46-50.
- Weber, W. A. 1958. Rediscovery of Neoparrya. Rhodora 60:265-271.
- Weber, W. A. 1959. Some features of the distribution of Arctic relicts at their austral limits. Proc. IX Internat. Bot. Congr. 2:425-426.
- Weber, W. A. 1962. Environmental modifications and the taxonomy of the crustose lichens. Sv. Bot. Tidskr. 56:293-333.
- Weber, W. A. 1963. Additions to the bryophyte flora of Colorado. Bryologist 66:192-200.
- Weber, W. A. 1967. A synopsis of the North American species of Cyphelium. Bryologist 70:197-203.
- Weber, W. A. 1976. Rocky Mountain Flora. 5th edition. Colorado Assoc., Univ. Press.
- Weber, W. A. and G. Argus. 1986. Salix lanata ssp. calcicola in Colorado. Madroño 33:148-149..
- Weber, W. A. 1987B. Colorado Flora: Western Slope. Colorado Assoc. Univ. Press.
- Weber, W. A. 1987. Noteworthy collections, Colorado. Bryum blindii BSG. Madroño 29:246.
- Weber, W. A. Lichenes Exsiccati distributed by the University of Colorado Museum, Fasc. 17-18, Nos. 641-700.
- Weber, W. A. (1997). King of Colorado Botany: Charles Christopher Parry, 1823-1890. Niwot, CO: Univ. Press of Colorado. ISBN 0-87081-431-1.
- Colbridge, J. N., and W. A. Weber. 1998. A Rocky Mountain Lichen Primer. University Press of Colorado, Niwot, Colorado.

== See also ==
- Category:Taxa named by William Alfred Weber
