= Siegfried Huneck =

German chemist and lichenologist (1928–2011)

- Siegfried Huneck working in his laboratory
- Born: 9 September 1928; Floh (Floh-Seligenthal)
- Died: 9 October 2011 (aged 83)
- Education: University of Jena; TU Dresden
- Awards: Acharius Medal (1996)
- Scientific career
- Fields: Natural product chemistry; Lichenology
- Workplaces: Leibniz Institute of Plant Biochemistry
- Author abbrev. (botany): Huneck

Siegfried Huneck (9 September 1928 – 9 October 2011) was a German chemist and lichenologist. Much of his scientific career was hampered by the political situation in the former German Democratic Republic. He rejected pursuing a career in academia, and instead ended up working at the Leibniz Institute of Plant Biochemistry, a public research institute, from 1969 until his retirement in 1993. Despite his relative isolation and restricted freedoms in East Germany, Huneck had numerous professional contacts both in Germany and abroad, and was a highly published scholar. Many of his more than 400 scientific publications dealt with the chemistry of lichen products. He was awarded the Acharius Medal for lifetime achievements in lichenology in 1996.

== Life and career ==
Siegfried Huneck was born on 9 September 1928 in Floh (Floh-Seligenthal), a small settlement in the Thuringian Forest region (Thuringia, Germany). He attended primary school there, and then grammar school for boys in Schmalkalden, which he completed in 1947 after a two-year delay caused by World War II. After the war ended, Huneck's region became part of the German Democratic Republic (GDR), where the actions of citizens were heavily controlled by the state. Starting in 1950, Huneck began employment as a laboratory worker in the RFT broadcasting station in Erfurt (doing metal analysis), and then a year later as a scientific-chemical assistant in the Volkseigener Betrieb ("people-owned factory") in Jenapharm.

Huneck applied to study chemistry at the University of Jena in 1951, but was refused entry because the GDR's socialist planned economy had decided that the country did not need chemists at the time and so no chemists were admitted. Instead, Huneck studied mathematics, waiting for a later opportunity to enrol in his program of choice. That opportunity came the following year, when 200 students were admitted. In 1957 Huneck had met all the requirements for a "Diplom-Chemiker" degree. His thesis was titled Über die Oleanolsäure und einige ihrer Derivate ("On oleanolic acid and some of its derivates"). Immediately afterwards he started working at the Institute for Organic Chemistry and Biochemistry at the Friedrich-Schiller-University in Jena as a scientific assistant, while simultaneously continuing his university studies on triterpenes.

In 1959, Siegfried Huneck received a PhD (magna cum laude) from the University of Jena defending a thesis on the chemistry of amino-derivatives of pentacyclic triterpenes (Über Aminosäuren von pentazyklischen Triterpenen). His interest in the chemistry of natural products was not matched by this university, so he transferred to the Institute of Plant Chemistry at the University of Dresden. He completed his habilitation here in 1964. His theme of habilitation research was Über photo- und stereochemische Untersuchungen an pentacyclischen Triterpenen ("On photo- and stereochemical investigations of pentacyclic triterpenes"). He received his degree after giving a lecture titled Chemotaxonomie, ein Grenzgebiet zwischen Chemie und Botanik ("Chemotaxonomy, a borderland between chemistry and botany").

Because of the post-war politics of East Germany, lectureships and professorships were only given to members of the Socialist Unity Party of Germany (also known as the East German Communist Party), a political party that he despised. He realised that he would not be able to be successful academically in that environment. Instead, he was able to find work at the Institute for the Biochemistry of Plants (later the Leibniz Institute of Plant Biochemistry) in Halle, a privately funded research institute. Here he was able to direct his efforts to the area that interested him the most: the study of natural compounds in lichens, liverworts, and higher plants. He remained here until his retirement. During his time here, he published about 250 papers, many of them as part of a series with the title "Mitteilungen uber Flechteninhaltsstoffe" ("Communications on lichen constituents").

Huneck was able to successfully isolate, elucidate, and synthesize many compounds previously unknown to science. His extensive network of friends and colleagues in the western world compensated for the lack of modern research equipment available for use in his laboratory. Although he was not allowed to travel outside of socialist countries, Huneck was able to participate in research expeditions to Tajikistan, Mongolia, and North Korea, where he collected plants and lichens for chemical analysis.

After the Revolutions of 1989 and the fall of the Berlin Wall, Huneck was free to visit his friends and colleagues, and he attended several scientific conferences and international meetings, as well as botanical excursions. He visited colleagues in Austria, Australia, Japan, Sweden, and the Netherlands. In September 1993, he was forced into mandatory retirement, and had to give up his laboratory and office space. Despite this, he still maintained contact with his colleagues and collaborators, and continued his scientific work, with several dozen publications after 1993. His final publication, a book titled 10.000 Kilometer unterwegs im Herzen Asiens. Expeditionsberichte aus der Mongolei, describes his expeditions in the Far East.

After his retirement, Huneck's lichen and moss collections (numbering about 7500 specimens) and isolated lichen products (about 1500) were transferred from Halle to the Botanical Garden and Herbarium in Berlin. A smaller collection (about 950 specimens) of mostly liverworts went to the Herbarium Haussknecht in Jena. His collection of lichen substances was later used to help create an open access database of high-resolution tandem mass spectrometry spectra for lichen metabolites. This initiative will help future researchers in identifying new metabolites, and will be useful for the chemical profiling of newly reported species.

== Personal ==
Huneck married Ruth Göhler in 1960, five years after meeting her at a dance. They had two sons together, Reinhard (born 1964) and Rolf (1967). After his retirement, in 1995, Huneck and his family moved to Langenbogen where they enjoyed a more rural lifestyle. In 2011, Huneck became seriously ill. After several weeks in hospital, he died on 9 September at the age of 83. His wife predeceased him by two years; according to his biographers, after this, "he lost interest in life".

== Recognition ==
A Festschrift in the Bibliotheca Lichenologica series was dedicated to Huneck in 1993 on the occasion of his 65th birthday and his retirement, titled Phytochemistry and Chemotaxonomy of Lichenized Ascomycetes – A Festschrift in honour of Siefgfried Huneck. The volume is a compilation of 28 scientific papers written by 63 of his friends and colleagues from 14 countries. Huneck was an honorary member of the Lichenological Society of Japan.

Huneck was awarded an Acharius Medal for lifetime achievements in lichenology in 1996. In his introduction of Huneck, colleague John Alan Elix considers Huneck a major influence on his decision to pursue similar fields of research in chemotaxonomy, writing that he "was particularly inspired by [Huneck]'s review of the then modern spectroscopic methods and how they could be utilised in the structural elucidation of these compounds".

=== Eponymy ===
The lichen genus Huneckia (family Teloschistaceae) was named in honour of Huneck. Three species have been named after Huneck: Opegrapha huneckii Follmann & Klement (1970); Geastrum huneckii Dörfelt (1981); and Pertusaria huneckiana Feige & Lumbsch (1993).

== Selected publications ==
A complete listing of Huneck's 412 authored and co-authored scientific publications is given in Stordeur and colleagues' 2011 obituary. Of these, about 250 publications concern lichenology. Some representative works include:

- Huneck, S.; Follmann, G. (1970). "Mitteilungen über Flechteninhaltsstoffe LXXVI. Zur Phytochemie und Chemotaxonomie der Buelliaceae" [Communications on lichen constituents LXXVI. On the phytochemistry and chemotaxonomy of the Buelliaceae]. Biochemie und Physiologie der Pflanzen (in German). 161: 191–214. doi:10.1016/S0015-3796(17)31038-7.
- Huneck, S. (1975). "Über die Inhaltsstoffe weiterer Lebermoose. XVII. Mitteilung über Moosinhaltsstoffe" [About the substances of other liverworts. XVIII. Communication on moss substances]. Journal of the Hattori Botanical Laboratory (in German). 39: 215–234.
- Huneck, S. (1983). "Chemistry and biochemistry of Bryophytes". In Schuster, Rudolf M. (ed.). New Manual of Bryology. Vol. I. Nichinan, Japan: The Hattori Botanical Laboratory. pp. 1–116. OCLC 10792214.
- Huneck, Siegfried; Yoshimura, Isao (1996). Identification of Lichen Substances. Berlin, Heidelberg: Springer. ISBN 978-3-642-85245-9.
- Huneck, S. (1991). "New results in the chemistry of lichens" (PDF). Symbiosis. 11: 225–248.
- Huneck, S. (2006). "Progress in the chemistry of lichen substances 2000–2005". Journal of the Hattori Botanical Laboratory. 100: 671–694.
- Huneck, Siegfried (2010). 10000 Kilometer unterwegs im Herzen Asiens. Expeditionsbericht aus der Mongolei (unter Mitwirkung von Hans-Dieter Knapp) [10000 kilometers on the road in the heart of Asia. Expedition report from Mongolia (in cooperation with Hans-Dieter Knapp)] (in German). Jena: Weissdorn-Verlag. ISBN 978-3-936055-61-0.
