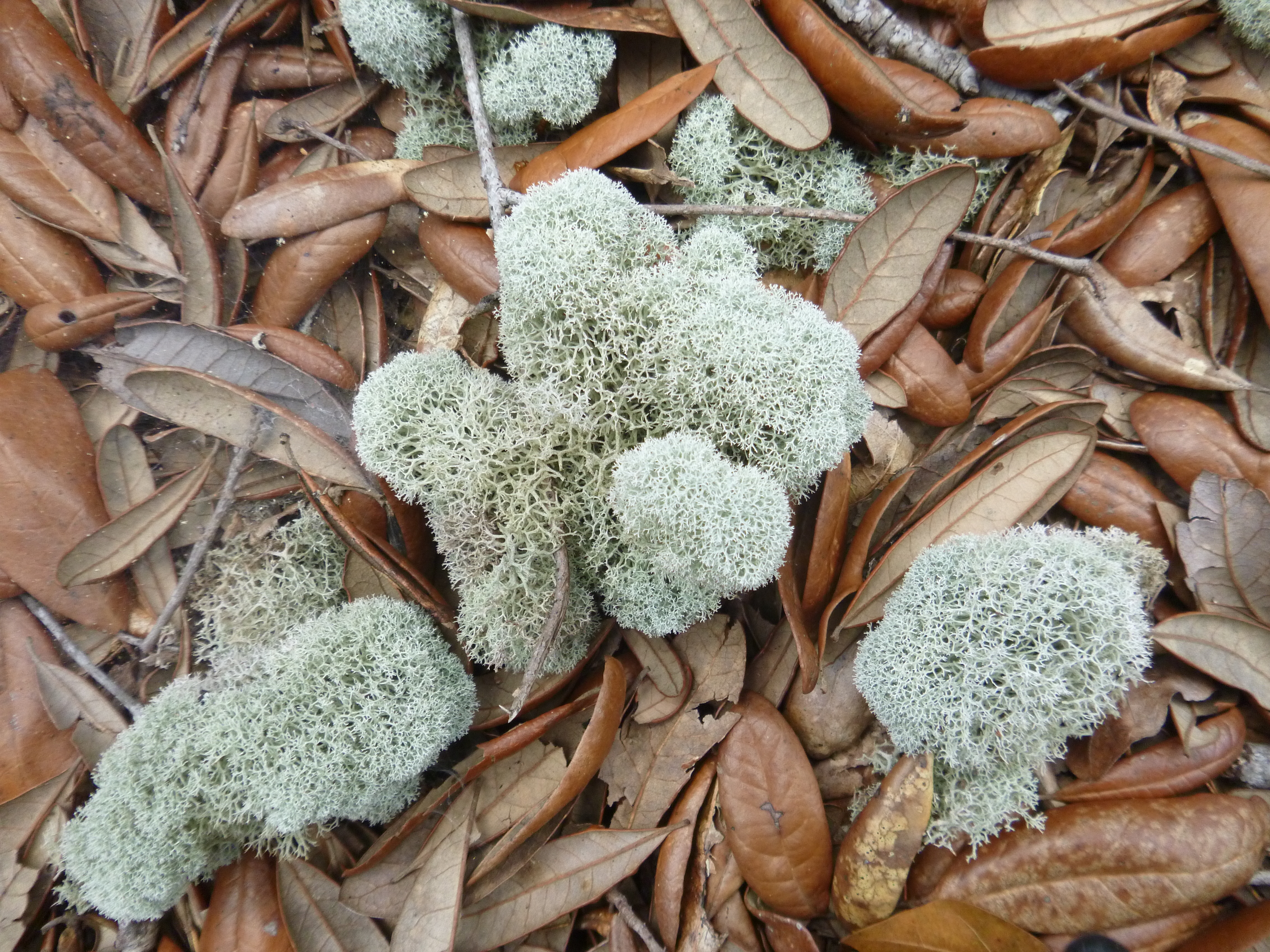

Conservation status
- Apparently Secure (NatureServe)

Scientific classification
- Kingdom: Fungi
- Division: Ascomycota
- Class: Lecanoromycetes
- Order: Lecanorales
- Family: Cladoniaceae
- Genus: Cladonia
- Species: C. evansii

Binomial name
- Cladonia evansii Abbayes

Synonyms
- Cladina evansii

= Cladonia evansii =

Species of lichen

Cladonia evansii, known as Evans' deer moss or Evans' reindeer moss, is a lichen in the family Cladoniaceae. It is found in the Southeastern United States, with a few instances in Cuba. The species was first formally named by Henry Nicollon des Abbayes.
