= Geastrum huneckii =

Scientific classification
- Domain: Eukaryota
- Kingdom: Fungi
- Division: Basidiomycota
- Class: Agaricomycetes
- Order: Geastrales
- Family: Geastraceae
- Genus: Geastrum
- Species: G. huneckii

Binomial name
- Geastrum huneckii Dörfelt (1981)

Species of fungus

Geastrum huneckii is a species of earthstar fungus in the family Geastraceae. Found in Mongolia, it was formally described as a new species in 1981 by German mycologist Heinrich Dörfelt. The species epithet honours his colleague Siegfried Huneck. Characteristics of the fungus include its hygroscopic exoperidium with four rays, a white endoperidium with a well-delimited peristome, and basidiospores measuring 5.5–6.5 μm in diameter.
