= Kappen Cliffs =

Location in Antarctica

The Kappen Cliffs (76°56′S 162°22′E) are steep rock cliffs that form the south edge of Kar Plateau on Scott Coast, Victoria Land, Antarctica. The cliffs are 5.5 nautical miles (10 km) long and rise to 600 metres (2,000 ft). They were named by the New Zealand Geographic Board (1999) after Professor Ludger Kappen of Kiel University, Germany, who conducted extensive lichen ecophysiology in the Cape Geology area.
