= Georgij Karlovich Kreyer =

Russian and Soviet botanist

Georgij Karlowitsch Kreyer (Russian: Георгий Карлович Крейер, romanized: Georgy Karlovich Kreyer; November 26, 1887 – January 11, 1942) was a Russian and Soviet botanist and mycologist (lichenologist) born in Saint Petersburg.

In academic publications, his name has been spelt variously Georgij Kalowic Kreyer, Georgij Karlowich Kreyer and (in Polish orthography) Georgij Karlowicz Kreyer. Between 1908 and 1910, he made extensive collections of lichens in the Mogilev Region of Belarus, between Orsha and Syanno, in the neighbourhood of the settlements of Smolyany, Bobromynichi (Vitebsk Region) and Selets.

The standard author abbreviation Kreyer is used to indicate this person as the author when citing a botanical name. Examples of names published Atropa caucasica Kreyer. (species now demoted to Atropa belladonna ssp. caucasica (Kreyer) Avet.) Kreyer is commemorated in the name of the plant species Valeriana kreyeriana Sumnev. in the genus Valeriana.

Kreyer was the editor of the 1913 work on fungi Mycota (180 pages) reissued in 1915. This includes descriptions of the morphology of 190 species, many of which go into some detail concerning intraspecific variability and feature discussions of the differences between taxa linked by virtue of their morphology.
