= Athanassios Giannis =

Greek chemist and physician (born 1954)

- Born: January 22, 1954 (age 72); Drama, Greece
- Education: University of Bonn
- Known for: Biologically and medicinally oriented organic synthesis; natural product synthesis (including work on cyclopamine and artemisinin); bioactive molecule and inhibitor design
- Scientific career
- Fields: Organic chemistry; natural products chemistry; medicinal chemistry
- Workplaces: Leipzig University; University of Bonn; University of Karlsruhe (TH)
- Doctoral advisor: Konrad Sandhoff

Athanassios Giannis (born 22 January 1954) is a Greek chemist and physician. He is a professor emeritus at Leipzig University, where he held a professorship in organic chemistry and natural products chemistry.

== Early life and education ==
Giannis was born in Drama, Greece. He studied chemistry at the University of Bonn (1972–1980) and medicine at the University of Bonn (1978–1988). He completed his diploma thesis in 1980 with Manfred T. Reetz and earned a PhD (Dr. rer. nat.) in 1986 under Konrad Sandhoff. He obtained his habilitation (venia legendi) in organic chemistry and biochemistry at the University of Bonn in 1992.

In a 2019 autobiographical account, Giannis wrote that he grew up under poor conditions in a small mountain village in northern Greece and moved to Bonn after school to study, stating that “all my belongings fit into a plastic bag”.

== Academic career ==
From 1992 to 1997, Giannis was associate professor of organic chemistry at the University of Bonn. From 1997 to 2002, he was professor of organic chemistry at the University of Karlsruhe (TH). In 2002, he moved to Leipzig University as full professor of organic chemistry and chemistry of natural products, and he later became professor emeritus.

Since 2020, he has also been listed as visiting professor at Leipzig University's Center for Biotechnology and Biomedicine (BBZ) and at the Leibniz Institute of Plant Biochemistry (IPB) in Halle, Germany.

== Research ==
Giannis works in biologically and medicinally oriented organic chemistry, combining synthetic methodology and natural product synthesis with medicinal-chemistry and chemical-biology questions. Research topics associated with his work include epigenetics; inhibitors of histone-modifying enzymes; immunomodulatory drugs and cereblon ligands; PROTAC-related concepts; nucleoside analogues; and the synthesis of bioactive natural products.

In 2009, Giannis and co-authors reported a biomimetic, diastereoselective synthesis of cyclopamine in Angewandte Chemie International Edition, which later reviews describe as the first synthesis of cyclopamine (via a semisynthetic approach). The same review describes the first total synthesis of cyclopamine as being reported in 2023 by another group.

In 2018, Giannis co-authored a study reporting the total synthesis and biological investigation of (−)-artemisinin and its natural antipode (+)-artemisinin, concluding that antimalarial activity is not stereospecific.

== Health system and humanitarian engagement ==
In a 2015 interview with Telepolis during the Greek debt crisis, Giannis discussed the humanitarian situation in Greece, including problems in healthcare provision, and addressed the implications for vulnerable groups, including refugees.

Giannis has also been associated with the humanitarian initiative Medikamenten-Nothilfe für Griechenland (Medication emergency aid for Greece). In a 2020 interview, he described the initiative as having been established in 2015 to support access to medicines and medical supplies and stated that, during the COVID-19 pandemic, support shifted toward medical equipment for an ambulance service providing examinations and preventive care in remote regions of Greece, including support for children and refugees. A 2015 newspaper report referred to the initiative as collaborating with Giannis and partners in Leipzig and Patras.

== Awards and honours ==
- Human Frontier Science Program (HFSP) award (2008).
- Doctor honoris causa, University of Patras (Faculty of Chemistry, 2010).
- Doctor honoris causa, University of Patras (Faculty of Pharmacy, 2010).

== Books ==
- Naturstoffe im Dienst der Medizin – Von der Tragödie zur Therapie (Springer, 2023).
- Natural Compounds Enabled Therapies: From Tragedy to Therapeutics (Springer, 2025).
