= Huneckia =

Scientific classification
- Domain: Eukaryota
- Kingdom: Fungi
- Division: Ascomycota
- Class: Lecanoromycetes
- Order: Teloschistales
- Family: Teloschistaceae
- Genus: Huneckia; S.Y.Kondr., Elix, Kärnefelt, A.Thell & Hur (2014)

Type species
- Huneckia pollinii (A.Massal.) S.Y.Kondr., Kärnefelt, A.Thell, Elix, J.Kim, A.S.Kondr. & Hur (2014)

Species
- H. crocina H. pollinii H. rheinigera H. wrightii

Genus of fungi

Huneckia is a genus of crustose lichens in the subfamily Caloplacoideae of the family Teloschistaceae. It has four species.

== Taxonomy ==
The genus was circumscribed in 2014 by Sergei Kondratyuk, Jack Elix, Ingvar Kärnefelt, Arne Thell, and Jae-Seoun Hur, as a segregate of the genus Caloplaca. Huneckia pollinii, a Northern Hemisphere species, was assigned as the type species, and the Australian H. rheinigera was also included in the initial circumscription of the genus. The generic name honours German chemist and lichenologist Siegfried Huneck, "1996 Acharius Medalist, who made many contributions to the field of lichen chemistry".

== Description ==
Huneckia species have a continuous, crustose thallus that is quite thin, with a cortex made of paraplectenchymatous tissue—a type of tissue in which the fungal hyphae are oriented in all directions. The apothecia are biatorine and have a brown disc. Lichen products found in the genus are chrysophanol, rhein and chrysophanal.

Huneckia is similar to Blastenia in morphology, but differs in ascospore structure: its spores have quite thick cell walls at the poles. The secondary chemistry is also different in some instances.

== Species ==
- Huneckia crocina (Kremp.) Wilk (2021)
- Huneckia pollinii (A.Massal.) S.Y.Kondr., Kärnefelt, Elix, A.Thell, Jung Kim, A.S.Kondr. & Hur (2014) – Northern Hemisphere
- Huneckia rheinigera (Elix & S.Y.Kondr.) S.Y.Kondr., Kärnefelt, Elix, A.Thell, Jung Kim, A.S.Kondr. & Hur (2014) – Australia
- Huneckia wrightii (Tuck.) Arup, Søchting & Bungartz (2020) – Galápagos Islands
