= Vernon Ahmadjian =

Lichenologist (1930-2012)

- Born: May 19, 1930; Whitinsville, Massachusetts
- Died: March 13, 2012 (aged 81); Falmouth, Massachusetts
- Education: Clark University, Harvard University
- Occupation(s): professor, Lichenologist

Vernon Ahmadjian (May 19, 1930 - March 13, 2012) was a distinguished professor at Clark University in Worcester, Massachusetts. He specialized in the symbiosis of lichens, and wrote several books and numerous publications on the subject.

== Career ==
Ahmadjian was born on May 19, 1930, in Whitinsville, Massachusetts. After graduating with his BA in 1952 from Clark University, Ahmadjian served for two years in the United States Army in the Combat Medical Corps during the Korean War. Upon his return to civilian life, Ahmadjian continued his studies at Clark, receiving his MA in 1956, and then went on to achieve his PhD from Harvard University in 1960.

Owing to his lichen field work in the 1960s at McMurdo Station in Antarctica, the National Science Foundation awarded him with the Antarctic Medal in 1967, and gave a peak in the Queen Alexandria Range of the Transantarctic Mountains the name of "Ahmadjian Peak".

In 1996, Ahmadjian was honored by the International Association for Lichenology (IAL) with an Acharius Medal for outstanding research in the field of lichenology.

Ahmadjian introduced the term 'chlorolichen' in 1989 to describe lichens with green algal photobionts, creating a clear terminological counterpart to 'cyanolichen' (for lichens with cyanobacterial photobionts). He first used the term in a paper on lichen bionts, writing "enough species of lichens with green photobionts (chlorolichens) have been synthesized", and later employed it in his 1993 book The Lichen Symbiosis. This terminology became widely adopted in lichenology for distinguishing between these two fundamental types of lichen symbioses.

Ahmadjian's influence on the field of lichenology extended beyond his direct research contributions. In 1995, he published an invited letter in BioScience stating that lichens were the dominant organism in 8% of terrestrial habitats on Earth, attributing this statistic to Douglas W. Larson. This claim, although unsupported by empirical evidence, became widely cited in both academic literature and popular media. A 2024 study by Drotos et al. traced the origins of this statistic, revealing it to be an unevidenced estimate that proliferated through scientific literature without critical evaluation. The study found 76 academic articles and 37 popular media items repeating variations of this claim, highlighting the importance of rigorous citation practices in scientific communication.

He died on March 13, 2012, in Falmouth, Massachusetts.

== Books ==
- Ahmadjian, Vernon. 1967. The Lichen Symbiosis. Blaisdell Publishing Co., Waltham, Mass., 152 pages.
- Ahmadjian, Vernon. 1993. The Lichen Symbiosis. John Wiley and Sons, Inc., New York, 250 pages. ISBN 0-471-57885-1
- Ahmadjian, V.; Hale, M. E., eds. (1974). The Lichens. New York: Academic Press. ISBN 978-0-12-044950-7.
- Ahmadjian, V., and S. Paracer. 1986. Symbiosis: An introduction to Biological Associations. Hanover, N. H., University Press of New England, 212 pages.
- Paracer, Surindar and Vernon Ahmadjian. 2000. Symbiosis, An Introduction to Biological Associations. Second Edition. Oxford University Press, ISBN 0-19-511807-3.

== Articles ==
- Ahmadjian, V. 1966. Lichens in Symbiosis. vol. 1. S. M. Henry, ed., New York, Academic Press, 35-97.
- Ahmadjian, V. 1967. A guide to the algae occurring as lichen symbionts: Isolation, culture, cultural physiology, and identification Phycologia 6:127-160.
- Ahmadjian, V. 1970a. The lichen symbiosis: Its origin and evolution. In, Evolutionary Biology. vol. 4. T. Dobzhansky, M. K. Hecht, and W. C. Steere, eds., Appleton-Century Crofts, N.Y., N.Y., 163-184.
- Ahmadjian, V. 1970b. Adaptations of Antarctic terrestrial plants. In, Antarctic Ecology. vol. 2. M. W. Holdgate, ed., London, Academic Press, 801-811.
- Ahmadjian, V. 1973a. Resynthesis of lichens. In, The Lichens. V. Ahmadjian and M. E. Hale, eds., New York, Academic Press, 565-579.
- Ahmadjian, V. 1973b. Methods of isolating and culturing lichen symbionts and thalli. In, The Lichens. V. Ahmadjian and M. E. Hale, eds., New York, Academic Press, 653-659.
- Ahmadjian, V. 1977. Qualitative requirements and utilization of nutrients: Lichens. In, CRC Handbook. Series in Nutrition and Food. vol. 1. J. M. Rechcigl, ed., Cleveland, CRc Press, Sec. D. Nutritional Requirements, 203-215.
- Ahmadjian, V. 1980. Separation and artificial synthesis of lichens. In, Cellular Interactions in Symbiosis and Parasitism. C. B. Cook, P. W. Pappas, and E. D. Rudolph, eds., Columbus, Ohio State University Press, 3-29.
- Ahmadjian, V. 1982a. Holobionts have more parts. International Lichenological Newsletter 15(2): 19.
- Ahmadjian, V. 1982b. The nature of lichens. Natural History 91: 30-37.
- Ahmadjian, V. 1982c. Algal/fungal symbioses. In, Progress in Phycological Research. vol. 1. F. E. Round and D. J. Chapman, eds., Amsterdam, Elsevier Biomedical Press, 179-233.
- Ahmadjian, V. 1987a. Coevolution in lichens. In, Endocytobiology. vol. 3. J. Lee and J. F. Fredrick, eds., New York Academy of Sciences, 307-315.
- Ahmadjian, V. 1987b. Laboratory culture of lichens and lichen symbionts. Proceedings of symposium on tissue culture of lichen and bryophyte. Kyoto, Nippon Paint Co. 1-13.
- Ahmadjian, V. 1988. The lichen alga Trebouxia: Does it occur free-living? Plant Systematics and Evolution 158: 243-247.
- Ahmadjian, V. 1989. Studies on the isolation and synthesis of bionts of the cyanolichen Peltigera canina (Peltigeraceae). Plant Systematics and Evolution 165: 29-38.
- Ahmadjian, V. 1990a. What have synthetic lichens told us about real lichens? Contributions to Lichenology. In honour of A. Henssen. Bibliotheca Lichenologica. vol. 38. H. M. Jahns, ed. Berlin-Stuttgart, J. Cramer, 3-12.
- Ahmadjian, V. 1990b. Trebouxia jamesii and the question of multinucleate cells in the lichen photobiont Trebouxia. Lichenologist 22: 321-324.
- Ahmadjian, V. 1991. Molecular biology of lichens: A look to the future. Symbiosis 11: 249-254.
- Ahmadjian, V. 1992. Basic mechanisms of signal exchange, recognition, and regulation in lichens. In, Algae and Symbioses: Plants, Animals, Fungi, Viruses, Interactions Explored. W. Reisser, ed., Bristol, Biopress Ltd., 675-697.
- Ahmadjian, V., and H. Heikkilä. 1970. The culture and synthesis of Endocarpon pusillum and Staurothele clopima. Lichenologist 4: 259-267.
- Ahmadjian, V., and J. B. Jacobs. 1970. The ultrastructure of lichens. III. Endocarpon pusillum. Lichenologist 4: 268-270.
- Ahmadjian, V., and J. B. Jacobs. 1981 Relationship between fungus and alga in the lichen Cladonia cristatella Tuck. Nature 289: 169-172.
- Ahmadjian, V., and J. B. Jacobs. 1982. Artificial re-establishment of lichens. III. Synthetic development of Usnea strigosa. Journal Hattori Botanical Laboratory 52: 393-399.
- Ahmadjian, V., and J. B. Jacobs. 1983. Algal-fungal relationships in lichens: Recognition, synthesis and development. In, Algal Symbiosis. L. J. Goff, ed., Cambridge, Cambridge University Press, 147-172.
- Ahmadjian, V., and J. B. Jacobs. 1985. Artificial reestablishment of lichens. IV. Comparison between natural and synthetic thalli of Usnea strigosa. Lichenologist 17: 149-165.
- Ahmadjian, V., and J. B. Jacobs. 1987. Studies on the development of synthetic lichens. In, Progress and Problems in Lichenology in the Eighties, Bibliotheca Lichenologia. vol. 25. E. Peveling, ed., Berlin-Stuttgart, J. Cramer, 47-48.
- Ahmadjian, V., J. J. Brink, and A. I. Shehata. 1990. Molecular biology of lichens—Search for plasmid DNA and the question of gene movement between bionts. pp. 2–21. Proceedings of International Symposium on Lichenology, Kyoto, Japan, Nippon Paint Company.
- Ahmadjian, V., V. M. Chadeganipour, A. M. Koriem and S. Paracer. 1987. DNA and protoplast isolations from lichens and lichen symbionts. Lichen Physiology and Biochemistry, 2-11.
- Ahmadjian, V., J. B. Jacobs, and L. A. Russell, 1978. Scanning electron microscope study of early lichen synthesis. Science 200: 1062-1064.
- Ahmadjian, V., L. A. Russell, and K. C. Hildreth. 1980. Artificial reestablishment of lichens. I. Morphological interactions between the phycobionts of different lichens and the mycobionts Cladonia cristatella and Lecanora chrysoleuca. Mycologia 72: 73-89.
- Culberson, C. F., and V. Ahmadjian. 1980. Artificial reestablishment of lichens. II. Secondary products or resynthesized Cladonia cristatella and Lecanora chrysoleuca. Mycologica 72: 90-109.
- Hildreth, K. C., and V. Ahmadjian. 1981. A study of Trebouxia and Pseudotrebouxia isolates from different lichens. Lichenologist 13: 65-86.
- Hill, D. J., and V. Ahmadjian. 1972. Relationship between carbohydrate movement and the symbiosis in lichens with green algae. Planta 103: 267-277.
- Jacobs, J. B., and V. Ahmadjian. 1969. The ultrastructure of lichens. I. A general survey. Journal of Phycology 5: 227-240.
- Jacobs, J. B., and V. Ahmadjian. 1971a. The ultrastructure of lichens. II. Cladonia cristatella: The lichen and its isolated symbionts. Journal of Phycology 7: 71-82.
- Jacobs, J. B., and V. Ahmadjian. 1971b. The ultrastructure of lichens. IV. Movement of carbon products from alga to fungus as demonstrated by high resolution radioautography. New Phytologist 70: 47-50.
- Jacobs, J. B., and V. Ahmadjian. 1973. The ultrastructure of lichens. V. Hydrothyria venosa, a fresh water lichen. New Phytologist 72: 155-160.
- Kieft, T. L., and V. Ahmadjian. 1989. Biological ice nucleation activity in lichen mycobionts and photobionts. Lichenologist 21: 355-362.
- Kinraide, W.T. B., and V. Ahmadjian. 1970. The effects of usnic acid on the physiology of cultured species of lichen alga Trebouxia Puym. Lichenologist 4: 234-247.
- Koriem, A. M., and V. Ahmadjian. 1986. An ultrastructural study of lichenized and cultured Nostoc photobionts of Peltigera canina, Peltigera rufescens, and Peltigera spuria. Endocytobiosis and Cell Research 3: 65-78.
- Leuckert, C., V. Ahmadjian, C. F. Culberson, and A. Johnson. 1990. Xanthones and depsidones of the lichen Lecanora dispersa in nature and of its mycobiont in culture. Mycologia 82: 370-378.
- Remmer, S. B., and V. Ahmadjian, and T. P. Livdahl. 1986. Effects of IAA (indole-3-acetic acid) and kinetin (6-furfurylamino-purine) on the synthetic lichen Cladonia cristatella and its isolated symbionts. Lichen Physiology and Biochemistry 1: 1-25.
- Rosentreter, R., and V. Ahmadjian. 1977. Effect of ozone on the lichen Cladonia arbuscula and the Trebouxia phycobiont of Cladina stellaris. Bryologist 80: 600-605.
- Schofield, E., and V. Ahmadjian. 1972. Field observations and laboratory studies of some Antarctic cold desert cryptograms. In, Antarctic Terrestrial Biology. vol. 20. G. A. Llano, ed., American Geophysical Union, Washington, D. C., 97-142.
- Slocum, R. D., V. Ahmadjian, and K. C. Hildreth. 1980. Zoosporogenesis in Trebouxia gelatinosa: Potential for zoospore release and implications for the lichen association. Lichenologist 12: 173-187.
- Wang-Yang, J. R., and V. Ahmadjian. 1972. A morphological study of the algal symbionts of Cladonia rangiferina (L.) Web. and Parmelia caperata (L.) Ach. Taiwania 17: 170-181.
- Withrow, K., and V. Ahmadjian. 1983. The ultrastructure of lichens. VII. Chiodectron sanguineum. Mycologia 75: 337-339.

== See also ==
- Category:Taxa named by Vernon Ahmadjian
