= Lichenology =

Branch of mycology that studies lichens

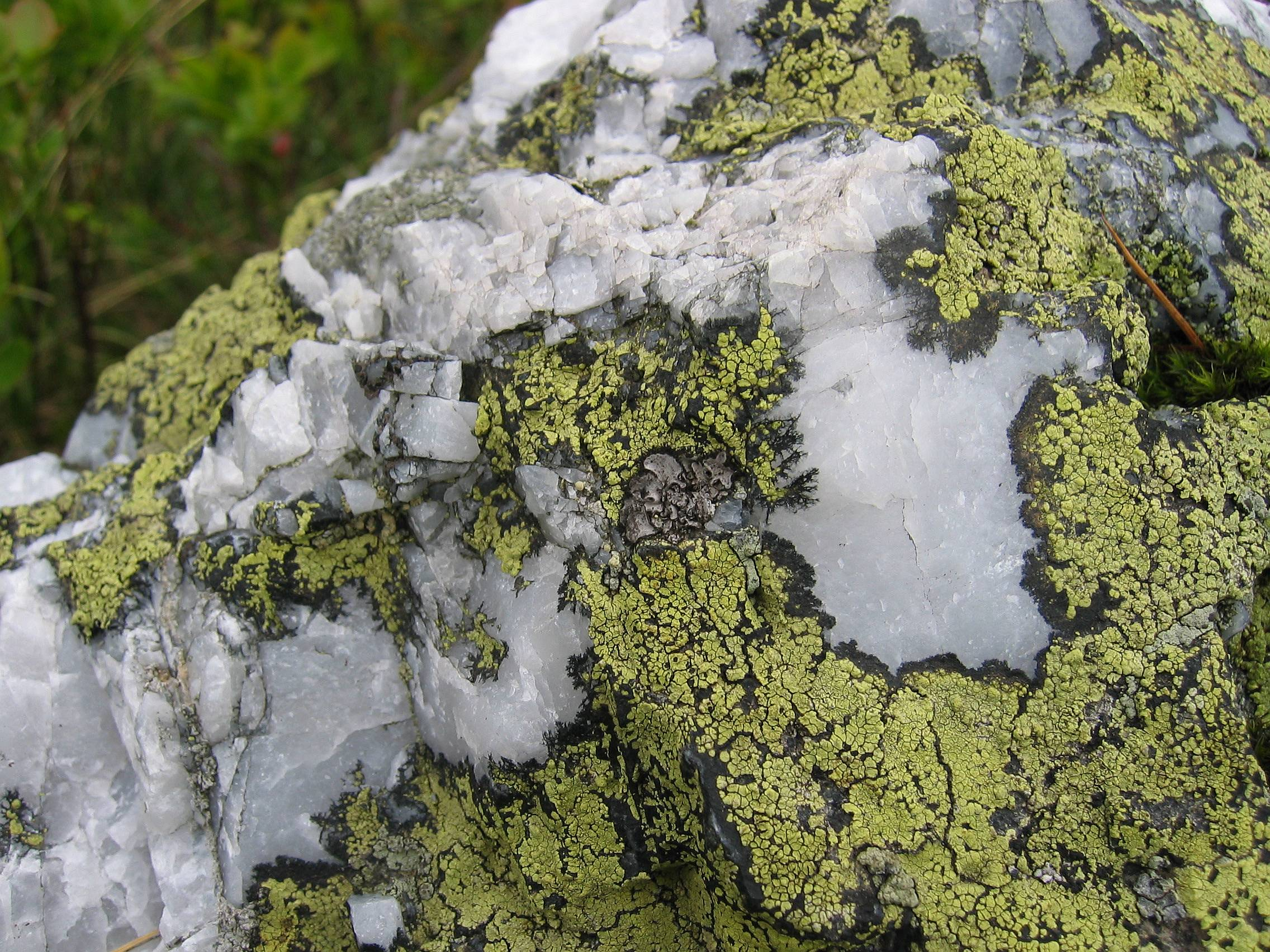
Lichen

Lichenology is the branch of mycology that studies the lichens, symbiotic organisms made up of an intimate symbiotic association of a microscopic alga (or a cyanobacterium) with a filamentous fungus. Lichens are chiefly characterized by this symbiosis.

Study of lichens draws knowledge from several disciplines: mycology, phycology, microbiology and botany. Scholars of lichenology are known as lichenologists. Study of lichens is conducted by both professional and amateur lichenologists.

Methods for species identification include reference to single-access keys on lichens. An example reference work is Lichens of North America (2001) by Irwin M. Brodo, Sylvia Sharnoff and Stephen Sharnoff and that book's 2016 expansion, Keys to Lichens of North America: Revised and Expanded by the same three authors joined by Susan Laurie-Bourque.

A chemical spot test can be used to detect the presence of certain lichen products which can be characteristic of a given lichen species. Some components of certain lichens may also fluoresce under ultraviolet light, providing another form of lichen identification test.

Lichenologists may also study the growth and growth rate of lichens, lichenometry, the role of lichens in nutrient cycling, the ecological role of lichens in biological soil crusts, the morphology of lichens, their anatomy and physiology, and ethnolichenology topics including the study of edible lichens. As with any other field of study, lichenology has its own set of rules for taxonomic nomenclature and its own set of other terminology.

== History ==
=== The beginnings ===
Lichens as a group have received less attention in classical treatises on botany than other groups although the relationship between humans and some species has been documented from early times. Several species have appeared in the works of Dioscorides, Pliny the Elder and Theophrastus although the studies are not very deep. During the first centuries of the modern age they were usually put forward as examples of spontaneous generation and their reproductive mechanisms were totally ignored. For centuries naturalists had included lichens in diverse groups until in the early 18th century a French researcher Joseph Pitton de Tournefort in his Institutiones Rei Herbariae grouped them into their own genus. He adopted the Latin term lichen, which had already been used by Pliny who had imported it from Theophrastus but up until then this term had not been widely employed. The original meaning of the Greek word λειχήν (leichen) was moss that in its turn derives from the Greek verb λείχω (liekho) to suck because of the great ability of these organisms to absorb water. In its original use the term signified mosses, liverworts as well as lichens. Some forty years later Dillenius in his Historia Muscorum made the first division of the group created by Tournefort separating the sub-families Usnea, Coralloides (Note: "mostly Clavarieae", according to Druce.) and Lichens in response to the morphological characteristics of the lichen thallus.

After the revolution in taxonomy brought in by Carl Linnaeus and his new system of classification lichens are retained in the Plant Kingdom forming a single group Lichen with eight divisions within the group according to the morphology of the thallus. The taxonomy of lichens was first intensively investigated by the Swedish botanist Erik Acharius (1757–1819), who is therefore sometimes named the "father of lichenology". Acharius was a student of Linnaeus. Some of his more important works on the subject, which marked the beginning of lichenology as a discipline, are:

- Lichenographiae Suecia prodromus (1798)
- Methodus lichenum (1803)
- Lichenographia universalis (1810)
- Synopsis methodica lichenum (1814)

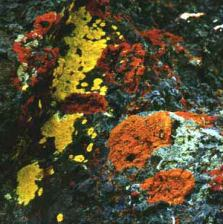
Lichen on rocks

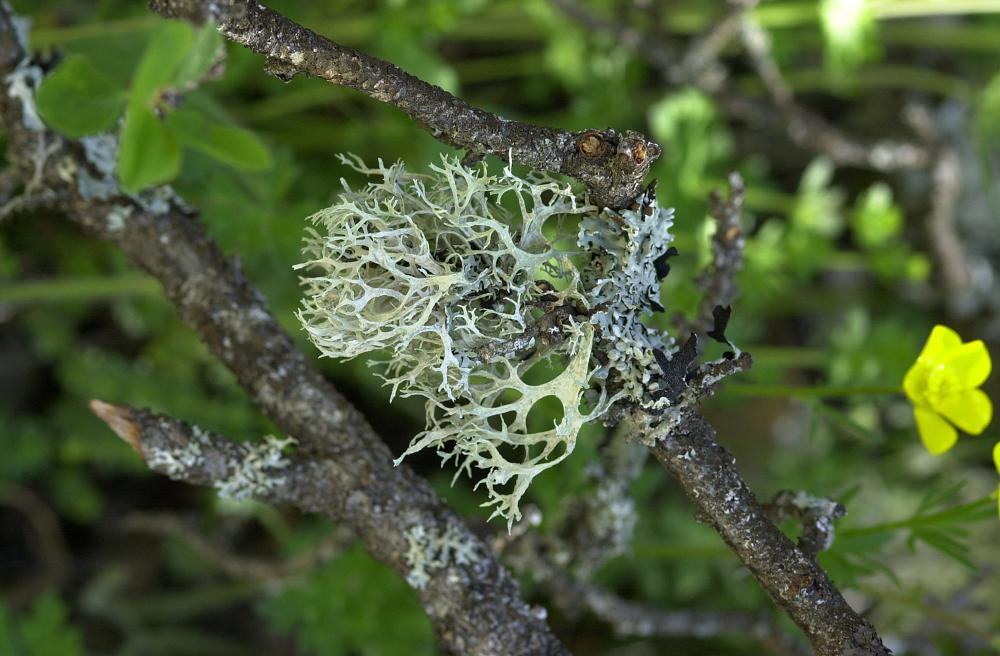
Oakmoss (Evernia prunastri)

Later lichenologists include the American scientists Vernon Ahmadjian and Edward Tuckerman and the Russian evolutionary biologist Konstantin Merezhkovsky, as well as amateurs such as Louisa Collings.

Over the years research shed new light into the nature of these organisms still classified as plants. A controversial issue surrounding lichens since the early 19th century is their reproduction. In these years a group of researchers faithful to the tenets of Linnaeus considered that lichens reproduced sexually and had sexual reproductive organs, as in other plants, independent of whether asexual reproduction also occurred. Other researchers only considered asexual reproduction by means of Propagules.

=== 19th century ===
Against this background appeared the Swedish botanist Erik Acharius disciple of Linnaeus, who is today considered the father of lichenology, starting the taxonomy of lichens with his pioneering study of Swedish lichens in Lichenographiae Suecicae Prodromus of 1798 or in his Synopsis Methodica Lichenum, Sistens omnes hujus Ordinis Naturalis of 1814. These studies and classifications are the cornerstone of subsequent investigations. In these early years of structuring the new discipline various works of outstanding scientific importance appeared such as Lichenographia Europaea Reformata published in 1831 by Elias Fries or Enumeratio Critico Lichenum Europaeorum 1850 by Ludwig Schaerer in Germany.

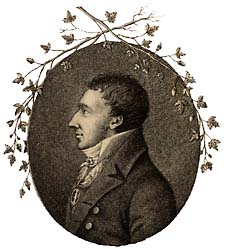
Erik Acharius (1757–1819), Swedish botanist, the father of lichenology

But these works suffer from being superficial and mere lists of species without further physiological studies. It took until the middle of the 19th century for research to catch up using biochemical and physiological methods. In Germany Hermann Itzigsohn and Johann Bayrhoffer, in France Edmond Tulasne and Camille Montagne, in Russia Fedor Buhse, in England William Allport Leighton and in the United States Edward Tuckerman began to publish works of great scientific importance.

Scientific publications settled many unknown facts about lichens. In the French publication Annales des Sciences Naturelles in an article of 1852 "Memorie pour servir a l'Histoire des Lichens Organographique et Physiologique" by Edmond Tulasne, the reproductive organs or apothecia of lichens was identified.

These new discoveries were becoming increasingly contradictory for scientists. The apothecium reproductive organ being unique to fungi but absent in other photosynthetic organisms. With improvements in microscopy, algae were identified in the lichen structure, which heightened the contradictions. At first the presence of algae was taken as being due to contamination due to collection of samples in damp conditions and they were not considered as being in a symbiotic relation with the fungal part of the thallus. That the algae continued to multiply showed that they were not mere contaminants.

It was Anton de Bary a German mycologist who specialised in phytopathology who first suggested in 1865 that lichens were merely the result of parasitism of various fungi of the ascomycetes group by nostoc type algae and others. Successive studies such as those carried out by Andrei Famintsyn and Baranetzky in 1867 showed no dependence of the algal component upon the lichen thallus and that the algal component could live independently of the thallus. It was in 1869 that Simon Schwendener demonstrated that all lichens were the result of fungal attack on the cells of algal cells and that all these algae also exist free in nature. This researcher was the first to recognise the dual nature of lichens as a result of the capture of the algal component by the fungal component. In 1873 Jean-Baptiste Edouard Bornet concluded form studying many different lichen species that the relationship between fungi and algae was purely symbiotic. It was also established that algae could associate with many different fungi to form different lichen phenotypes.

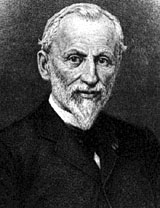
French botanist (Jean-Baptiste) Édouard Bornet (1828–1911)

=== 20th century ===
In 1909 the Russian lichenologist Konstantin Mereschkowski presented a research paper "The Theory of two Plasms as the basis of Symbiogenesis, A new study on the Origin of Organisms", which aims to explain a new theory of Symbiogenesis by lichens and other organisms as evidenced by his earlier work "Nature and Origin of Chromatophores in the Plant Kingdom". These new ideas can be studied today under the title of the Theory of Endosymbiosis.

Despite the above studies the dual nature of lichens remained no more than a theory until in 1939 the Swiss researcher Eugen A Thomas was able to reproduce in the laboratory the phenotype of the lichen Cladonia pyxidata by combining its two identified components.

During the 20th century botany and mycology were still attempting to solve the two main problems surrounding lichens. On the one hand the definition of lichens and the relationship between the two symbionts and the taxonomic position of these organisms within the plant and fungal kingdoms. There appeared numerous renowned researchers within the field of lichenology such as Henry Nicollon des Abbayes, William Alfred Weber, Antonina Georgievna Borissova, Irwin M. Brodo, and George Albert Llano.

Lichenology has found applications beyond biology itself in the field of geology in a technique known as lichenometry where the age of an exposed surface can be found by studying the age of lichens growing on them. Age dating in this way can be absolute or relative because the growth of these organisms can be arrested under various conditions. The technique provides an average age of the older individual lichens providing a minimum age of the medium being studied. Lichenometry relies upon the fact that the maximum diameter of the largest thallus of an epilithic lichen growing on a substrate is directly proportional to the time from first exposure of the area to the environment as seen in studies by Roland Beschel in 1950 and is especially useful in areas exposed for less than 1000 years. Growth is greatest in the first 20 to 100 years with 15–50 mm growth per year and less in the following years with average growth of 2–4 mm per year.

The difficulty of giving a definition applicable to every known lichen has been debated since lichenologists first recognised the dual nature of lichens. In 1982 the International Association for Lichenology convened a meeting to adopt a single definition of lichen drawing on the proposals of a committee. The chairman of this committee was the renowned researcher Vernon Ahmadjian. The definition finally adopted was that lichen could be considered as the association between a fungus and a photosynthetic symbiont resulting in a thallus of specific structure.

Such a simple a priori definition soon brought criticism from various lichenologists and there soon emerged reviews and suggestions for amendments. For example, David L. Hawksworth considered the definition imperfect because it is impossible to determine which one thallus is of a specific structure since thalli changed depending upon the substrate and conditions in which they developed. This researcher represents one of the main trends among lichenologists who consider it impossible to give a single definition to lichens since they are a unique type of organism.

Today studies in lichenology are not restricted to the description and taxonomy of lichens but have application in various scientific fields. Especially important are studies on environmental quality that are made through the interaction of lichens with their environment. Lichen is extremely sensitive to various air pollutants, especially to sulphur dioxide, which causes acid rain and prevents water absorption.

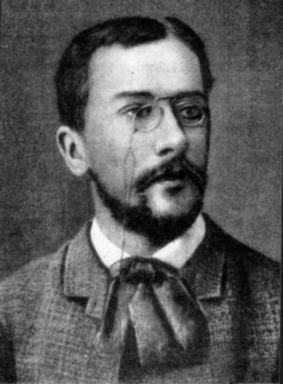
K S Merezhkovsky Russian Lichenologist (1855–1921)

== Lichens in pharmacology ==
Although several species of lichen have been used in traditional medicine it was not until the early 20th century that modern science became interested in them. The discovery of various substances with antibacterial action in lichen thalli was essential for scientists to become aware of the possible importance of these organisms to medicine. From the 1940s there appeared various works by the noted microbiologist Rufus Paul Burkholder who demonstrated antibacterial action of lichens of the genus Usnea against Bacillus subtilis and Sarcina lutea. Studies showed that the substance that inhibited growth of bacteria was usnic acid. Something similar occurred with the substance Ramelina synthesised by the lichen Ramalina reticulata, nevertheless, these substances proved ineffective against Gram negative bacteria such as Escherichia coli and Pseudomonas. With these investigations the number of antibacterial substances and possible drug targets known to be produced by lichens increased ergosterol, usnic acid etc.

Interest in the potential of substances synthesised by lichens increased with the end of World War II along with the growing interest in all antibiotic substances. In 1947 antibacterial action was identified in extracts of Cetraria islandica and the compounds identified as responsible for bacterial inhibition were shown to be d-protolichosteric acid and d-1-usnic acid. Further investigations have identified novel antibacterial substances, Alectosarmentin or Atranorin.

Antibacterial action of substances produced by lichens is related to their ability to disrupt bacterial proteins with a subsequent loss of bacterial metabolic capacity. This is possible due to the action of lichen phenolics such as usnic acid derivatives.

From the 1950s the lichen product usnic acid was the object of most antitumour research. These studies revealed some in vitro antitumour activity by substances identified in two common lichens Peltigera leucophlebia and Collema flaccidum.

Recent work in the field of applied biochemistry has shown some antiviral activity with some lichen substances. In 1989 K Hirabayashi presented his investigations on inhibitory lichen polysaccharides in HIV infection.

== Bibliography ==
- "Protocols in Lichenology: Culturing, Biochemistry, Ecophysiology and Use in Biomonitoring" (Springer Lab Manuals, Kraner, Ilse, Beckett, Richard and Varma, Ajit (28 Nov 2001)
- Lichenology in the British Isles, 1568–1975: An Historical and Biographical Survey, D. L. Hawksworth and M. R. D. Seaward (Dec 1977)
- "Lichenology: Progress and Problems" (Special Volumes/Systematics Association) Denis Hunter Brown et al. (10 May 1976)
- Lichenology in Indian Subcontinent, Dharani Dhar Awasthi (1 Jan 2000)
- Lichenology in Indian Subcontinent 1966–1977, Ajay Singh (1980)
- CRC Handbook of Lichenology, Volume II: v.2, Margalith Galun (30 Sep 1988)
- A Textbook of General Lichenology, Albert Schneider (24 May 2013)
- Horizons in Lichenology D. H. Dalby (1988)
- Bibliography of Irish Lichenology, M. E. Mitchell (Nov 1972)
- Diccionario de Liquenologia/Dictionary of Lichenology, Kenneth Allen Hornak (1998)
- "Progress and Problems in Lichenology in the Eighties: Proceedings" (Bibliotheca Lichenologica), Elisabeth Peveling (1987)
- A Textbook of General Lichenology with Descriptions and Figures of the Genera Occurring in the North Eastern United States, Albert Schneider (Mar 2010)
- The Present Status and Potentialities of the Lichenology in China, Liu Hua Jie (1 Jan 2000)
- Lichens to Biomonitor the Environment, Shukla, D. K. Vertika, Upreti and Bajpai, Rajesh (Aug 2013)
- Lichenology and Bryology in the Galapagos Islands with Checklists of the Lichens and Bryophytes thus far Reported, William A. Weber (1966)
- Flechten Follmann: Contributions to Lichenology in Honour of Gerhard Follmann, Gerhard Follmann, F. J. A. Daniels, Margot Schultz and Jorge Peine (1995)
- Environmental Lichenology: Biomonitoring Trace Element Air Pollution, Joyce E. Sloof (1993)
- The Journal of the Hattori Botanical Laboratory: Devoted to Bryology and Lichenology, Zennosuke Iwatsuki (1983)
- Contemporary Lichenology and Lichens of Western Oregon, W. Clayton Fraser (1968)
- Irish Lichenology 1858–1880: Selected Letters of Isaac Carroll, Theobald Jones, Charles Larbalestier (1996)
- Lichens from West of Hudson's Bay (Lichens of Arctic America Vol. 1), John W. Thompson (1953)
- Les Lichens - Morphologie, Biologie, Systematique, Fernand Moreau (1927)
- "Eric Acharius and his Influence on English Lichenology" (Botany Bulletins), David J. Galloway (Jul 1988)
- "Lichenographia Thompsoniana: North American Lichenology in Honour of John W. Thompson", M. G. Gleen (May 1998)
- "Monitoring with Lichens-Proceedings of the NATO Advanced Research Workshop", Nimis, Pier Luigi, Scheidegger, Christoph and Wolseley, Patricia (Dec 2001)
- Contributions to Lichenology: In Honour of A. Henssen, H. M. Jahns and A. Henssen (1990)
- Studies in Lichenology with Emphasis on Chemotaxonomy, Geography and Phytochemistry: Festschrift Christian Leuckert, Johannes Gunther Knoph, Kunigunda Schrufer and Harry J. M. Sipman (1995)
- Swedish Lichenology: Dedicated to Roland Moberg, Jan Erik Mattsson, Mats Wedin and Inga Hedberg (Sep 1999)
- Index of Collectors in Knowles the Lichens of Ireland (1929) and Porter's Supplement: with a Conspectus of Lichen, M. E. Mitchell, Matilda C. Knowles and Lilian Porter (1998)
- Biodeterioration of Stone Surfaces: Lichens and Biofilms as Weathering Agents of Rocks and Cultural Heritage, Larry St. Clair and Mark Seaward (Oct 2011)
- The Lichen Symbiosis, Vernon Ahmadjian (Aug 1993)
- Lichen Biology, Thomas H. Nash (Jan 2008)
- Fortschritte der Chemie organischer Naturstoffe/ Progress in the Chemistry of Organic Natural Products, S. Hunek (Oct 2013)

== Notable lichenologists ==
- Henry Nicollon des Abbayes
- Erik Acharius
- Vernon Ahmadjian
- André Aptroot
- Johannes Müller Argoviensis
- Ferdinand Christian Gustav Arnold
- Heinrich Anton de Bary
- Friedrich August Georg Bitter
- Alphonse Boistel
- Antonina Borissova
- Jean-Baptiste Édouard Bornet
- Irwin M. Brodo
- François Fulgis Chevallier
- Louisa Collings
- Chicita F. Culberson
- William Louis Culberson
- Johann Jacob Dillenius
- Alexander Elenkin
- Andrei Famintsyn
- Elias Magnus Fries
- Nina Golubkova
- Mason Hale
- Carolyn Wilson Harris (1849–1910)
- David Leslie Hawksworth
- Georg Franz Hoffmann
- Peter Wilfred James
- August von Krempelhuber
- Georgij Karlovich Kreyer
- Syo Kurokawa
- William Allport Leighton
- Konstantin Mereschkowski
- Camille Montagne
- Sanjeeva Nayaka
- William Nylander
- Charles Christian Plitt
- Francis Rose
- Rolf Santesson
- Simon Schwendener
- Joseph Pitton de Tournefort
- Edward Tuckerman
- Edmond Tulasne
- Dalip Kumar Upreti
- Edvard August Vainio
- Erna Walter
- Heinrich Walter
- William Alfred Weber
- Francis Wilson
- Alexander Zahlbruckner

== Lichenology organizations ==
- British Lichen Society
- American Bryological and Lichenological Society
- International Association for Lichenology

== Lichen collections ==
- British Lichen Society
- Botanische Staatssammlung München
- Canadian Museum of Nature
- Centraalbureau voor Schimmelcultures
- National Botanical Research Institute (CSIR), India
- Iowa State University, Ada Hayden Herbarium, Ames, Iowa
- National Museum Cardiff
- Natural History Museum, London
- New York Botanical Garden
- Royal Botanic Garden, Edinburgh
- Royal Botanic Gardens, Kew, London
- University of Michigan Herbarium, Ann Arbor, Michigan
- University of Wisconsin-Madison Herbarium, Madison, Wisconsin
- Ulster Museum, Belfast

== See also ==
- Outline of lichens
- Acharius Medal, an award in lichenology
