= Surface exposure dating =

Geochronological techniques for estimating length of time rock has been exposed

Surface exposure dating is a collection of geochronological techniques for estimating the length of time that a rock has been exposed at or near Earth's surface. Surface exposure dating is used to date glacial advances and retreats, erosion history, lava flows, meteorite impacts, rock slides, fault scarps, cave development, and other geological events. It is most useful for rocks which have been exposed for between 10^{3} and 10^{6} years.

== Cosmogenic radionuclide dating ==
The most common of these dating techniques is cosmogenic radionuclide dating. Earth is constantly bombarded with primary cosmic rays, high energy charged particles – mostly protons and alpha particles. These particles interact with atoms in atmospheric gases, producing a cascade of secondary particles that may in turn interact and reduce their energies in many reactions as they pass through the atmosphere. This cascade includes a small fraction of hadrons, including neutrons. When one of these particles strikes an atom it can dislodge one or more protons and/or neutrons from that atom, producing a different element or a different isotope of the original element. In rock and other materials of similar density, most of the cosmic ray flux is absorbed within the first meter of exposed material in reactions that produce new isotopes called cosmogenic nuclides. At Earth's surface most of these nuclides are produced by neutron spallation. Using certain cosmogenic radionuclides, scientists can date how long a particular surface has been exposed, how long a certain piece of material has been buried, or how quickly a location or drainage basin is eroding. The basic principle is that these radionuclides are produced at a known rate, and also decay at a known rate. Accordingly, by measuring the concentration of these cosmogenic nuclides in a rock sample, and accounting for the flux of the cosmic rays and the half-life of the nuclide, it is possible to estimate how long the sample has been exposed to the cosmic rays. The cumulative flux of cosmic rays at a particular location can be affected by several factors, including elevation, geomagnetic latitude, the varying intensity of the Earth's magnetic field, the solar wind, and atmospheric shielding due to air pressure variations. Rates of nuclide production must be estimated in order to date a rock sample. These rates are usually estimated empirically by comparing the concentration of nuclides produced in samples whose ages have been dated by other means, such as radiocarbon dating, thermoluminescence, or optically stimulated luminescence.

The excess relative to natural abundance of cosmogenic nuclides in a rock sample is usually measured by means of accelerator mass spectrometry. Cosmogenic nuclides such as these are produced by chains of spallation reactions. The production rate for a particular nuclide is a function of geomagnetic latitude, the amount of sky that can be seen from the point that is sampled, elevation, sample depth, and density of the material in which the sample is embedded. Decay rates are given by the decay constants of the nuclides. These equations can be combined to give the total concentration of cosmogenic radionuclides in a sample as a function of age. The two most frequently measured cosmogenic nuclides are beryllium-10 and aluminum-26. These nuclides are particularly useful to geologists because they are produced when cosmic rays strike oxygen-16 and silicon-28, respectively. The parent isotopes are the most abundant of these elements, and are common in crustal material, whereas the radioactive daughter nuclei are not commonly produced by other processes. As oxygen-16 is also common in the atmosphere, the contribution to the beryllium-10 concentration from material deposited rather than created in situ must be taken into account. ^{10}Be and ^{26}Al are produced when a portion of a quartz crystal (SiO_{2}) is bombarded by a spallation product: oxygen of the quartz is transformed into ^{10}Be and the silicon is transformed into ^{26}Al. Each of these nuclides is produced at a different rate. Both can be used individually to date how long the material has been exposed at the surface. Because there are two radionuclides decaying, the ratio of concentrations of these two nuclides can be used without any other knowledge to determine an age at which the sample was buried past the production depth (typically 2–10 meters).

Chlorine-36 nuclides are also measured to date surface rocks. This isotope may be produced by cosmic ray spallation of calcium or potassium.

== See also ==
- Climate proxy
- Lichenometry, measurement of exposure time based on lichen growth
