= Raine Loo =

Estonian actress (1945–2020)

- Born: 28 March 1945; Taevere Parish, Viljandi County, Estonia
- Died: 16 May 2020 (aged 75); Estonia
- Resting place: Raadi cemetery
- Other names: Raine Trass
- Occupation: Actress
- Years active: 1964–2020
- Spouse: Hans Trass
- Children: Toomas Trass

Raine Loo (28 March 1945 – 16 May 2020) was an Estonian stage, television and film actress.

== Early life and education ==
Raine Loo was born in the former Taevere Parish in Viljandi County, which is now part of Põhja-Sakala Parish. She attended No. 8 School in Tartu (now, the Tartu Forselius School), graduating in 1963. Afterward, she studied acting at the Vanemuine teaching studio, where she graduated in 1965.

== Stage career ==
In 1965, Loo became engaged at the Vanemuine theatre as an actress. Her first major role at the Vanemuine was that of Ingrid in a 1965 production of Mati Unt's See maailm või teine. Notable performances at the Vanemuine have included roles in works by such varied international authors and playwrights as: Shakespeare, Chekhov, Johann Wolfgang von Goethe, T. S. Eliot, Molière, Maxim Gorky, Ion Druță, Friedrich Schiller, Witold Gombrowicz and Arthur Miller, among others. Roles in productions of Estonian authors and playwrights include: Lilli Promet, Oskar Luts, August Kitzberg, A. H. Tammsaare, Karl Ristikivi, and Mart Kivastik.

Raine Loo would remain at the Vanemuine until her dismissal from the theatre in 2004, nearly forty years after she began her engagement.

== Film and television ==
Loo made her film debut in the 1975 Virve Aruoja and Jaan Tooming-directed drama Värvilised unenäod for Tallinnfilm. This was followed by the role of Epp Loona in the 1981 Arvo Kruusement-directed film adaptation of the 1938 August Gailit novel Karge meri, which chronicles the lives of seal hunters living on the coast of the Baltic Sea.

Other prominent film roles include Proua Fisch in the 1989 Peeter Simm-directed drama Inimene, keda polnud; Kristiine in the 1990 Jaan Kolberg-directed drama See kadunud tee, starring Tarmo Koidla; Teresa in the Rainer Sarnet-directed science fiction film Kass kukub käppadele: Pauli laululaegas, starring Taavi Eelmaa; and as Mare Nurk/Vanaema in the 2005 Rainer Sarnet-directed thriller Libahundi needus, starring Katariina Lauk.

In 2007, she appeared as Lydia in the Peeter Simm-directed biographical film Georg, which chronicled the life of Estonian singer Georg Ots.

Loo has also appeared in a number of feature-length, made-for-television films, including the 1970 Virve Aruoja-directed historical drama Kolme katku vahel, which starred Georg Ots, Ants Eskola and Ants Lauter; she also appeared in the 1978 telefilm musical Imelugu, directed by Irene Lään.

== Personal life ==
Raine Loo was married to Estonian botanist and ecologist Hans Trass, who died in February 2017. The couple had a son, composer and organist Toomas Trass. She died on 16 May 2020, aged 75, and was buried in Raadi cemetery in Tartu.

== Acknowledgements ==
- Meritorious Artist of the Estonian SSR (1976)
- Estonian Actors' Union honor (2004)
