= Acharius Medal =

Award for lifetime achievement in lichenology

- Description: Medal awarded for lifetime achievement in lichenology
- Country: International
- Presented by: International Association for Lichenology (IAL)

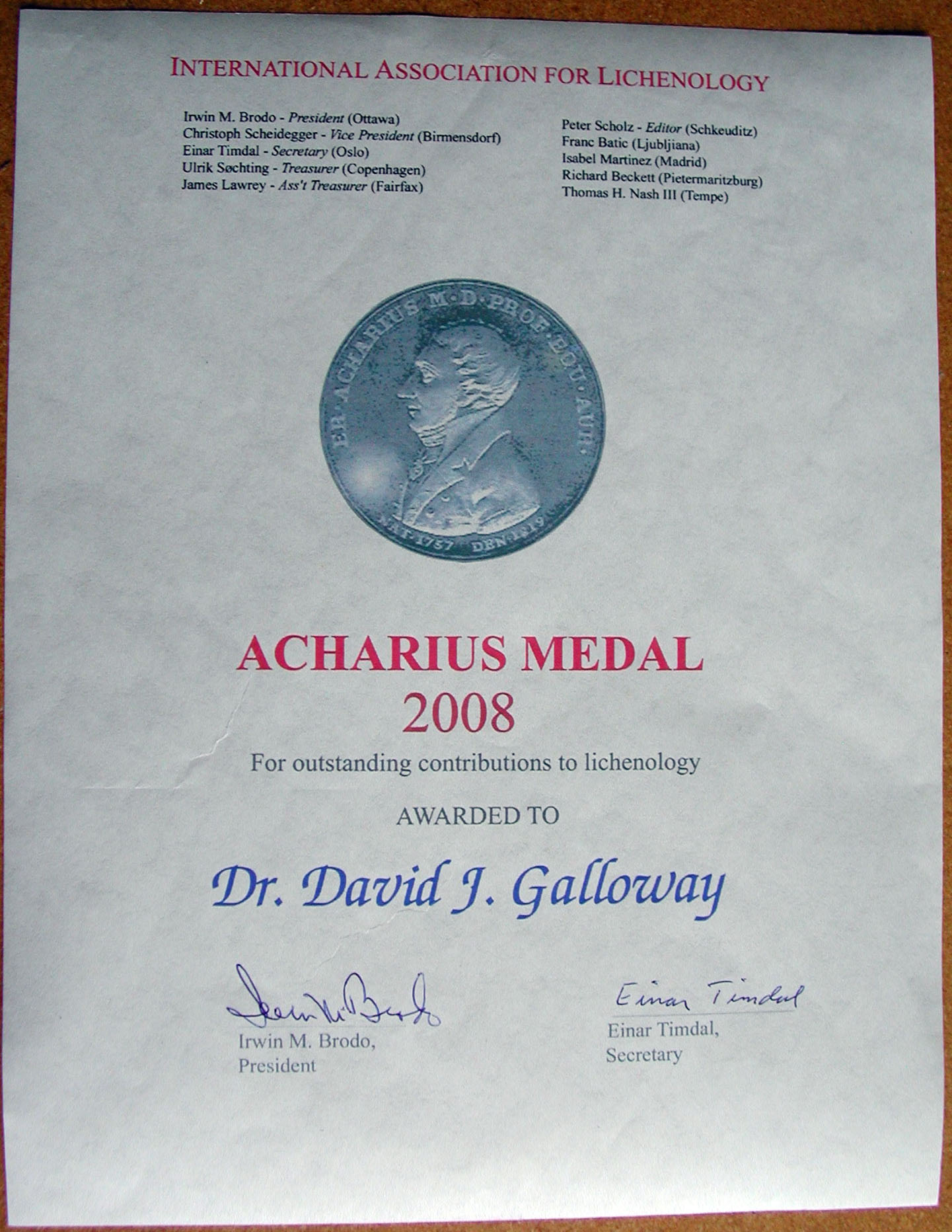
Photo of the certificate accompanying Acharius Medal awarded to David J. Galloway in 2008

The Acharius Medal is awarded by the International Association for Lichenology (IAL) for lifetime achievement in lichenology. The organization resolved at its 1990 meeting that it would simultaneously honor professional achievement and commemorate Erik Acharius (recognized as the "Father of Lichenology") by presenting a medal in his name.

The first Acharius Medal was made in 1846 by the Royal Swedish Mint for the Royal Swedish Academy of Sciences, although the original purpose for that medal is not known. Because the Swedish Mint still had the dies for the original medal, the IAL arranged for new medals to be made. The first of the new medals were awarded in that same year (1992) at the association's congress in Båstad, Sweden.

== The medal ==
The medal is silver, with Acharius' profile on one side and the recipient's name on the other.

== Recipients ==
2024:

- Kansri Boonpragob

2021:

- Per Magnus Jørgensen
- James D. Lawrey

2018:

- William Alfred Weber

2016:

- Thomas George Allan Green
- Josef Hafellner
- Bruce McCune

2014:

- Peter Crittenden
- Pier Luigi Nimis

2012:

- Ana Crespo
- Leif Tibell

2010:

- Brian J. Coppins
- Thomas Hawkes Nash

2008:

- David J. Galloway
- Hannes Hertel
- Rosmarie Honegger

2006:

- Mark R. D. Seaward

2004:

- John A. Elix
- Ludger Kappen
- Marie-Agnès Letrouit-Galinou

2003

- David C. Smith

2002:

- David L. Hawksworth

2000:

- Teuvo Ahti
- Georges Clauzade
- Nina Golubkova

1996:

- Vernon Ahmadjian
- Siegfried Huneck
- Christian Leuckert

1994:

- Irwin M. Brodo
- Margalith Galun
- Syo Kurokawa
- Elisabeth Tschermak-Woess

1992:

- Dharani Dhar Awasthi
- Chicita F. Culberson
- William L. Culberson
- Gunnar Degelius
- Aino Henssen
- Peter Wilfred James
- Hildur Krog
- Otto Ludwig Lange
- Josef Poelt
- Rolf Santesson
- John W. Thomson
- Hans Trass
- Antonin Vězda

== See also ==
- List of biology awards
