= Dharani Dhar Awasthi =

Indian lichenologist (born 1922)

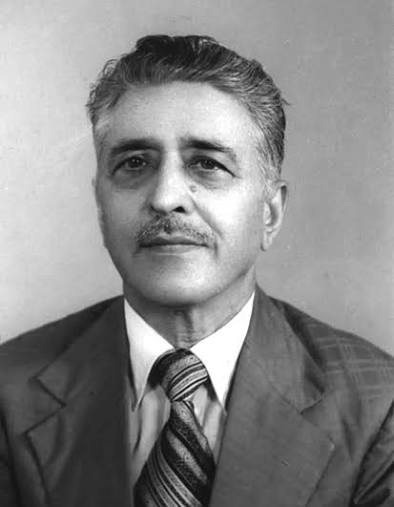
- Born: 28 September 1922; Naret village, Pithoragarh District, Uttarakhand
- Died: 21 August 2011 (aged 88); Lucknow, Uttar Pradesh, India
- Known for: widely considered as the Father of Indian Lichenology

Academic background
- Education: Lucknow University (Ph.D., 1961)
- Doctoral advisor: Dr. Sachindra Nath Dasgupta

Academic work
- Doctoral students: Dalip Kumar Upreti
- Main interests: Lichenology

Dharani Dhar Awasthi was an Indian botanist, taxonomist, and lichenologist, often given the appellation "Father of Indian Lichenology".

== Education and career ==
Awasthi graduated in botany from the University of Lucknow with B.Sc. in 1943 and M.Sc. in 1945. From 1945 to 1946 he was a research assistant in the University of Lucknow's department of botany. From 1946 to 1948 he worked at Kolkata's Botanical Garden and Herbarium in a stipendiary training programme in systematic botany and taxonomy. In 1947 he received a Ph.D. from the University of Lucknow. His doctoral advisor was Sachindra Nath Das Gupta (1902–1990). From 1948 to 1952 Awasthi worked as a botanical assistant at Lucknow's National Botanical Research Institute (NBRI). From 1952 until the end of his career he was (except for sabbaticals) a faculty member in the University of Lucknow's botany department. With support from the Fulbright Program he studied from 1960 to 1963 in the US for advanced training in lichenology under William Alfred Weber at the University of Colorado Boulder. There in 1963 Awasthi received his second Ph.D. In 1963 he returned to the University of Lucknow. During his career there he was the doctoral advisor for eight Ph.D. students, including Dalip Kumar Upreti. At the University of Lucknow, when Awasthi was superannuated in the 1990s, Lucknow's pioneering school of lichenology was closed, but his students flourished in various universities and institutions.

He alone or jointly revised more than 70 genera of lichens and described more than 75 species.

When he first began his research, very little was known about the lichen flora of India and most type specimens were held in European herbaria. Awasthi has made particular progress in making information available for students in his home country and building up a comprehensive herbarium.

The lichen genera Awasthiella and Awasthia, as well as several lichen species, are named in his honour.

== Awards and honours ==
- 1978 — Fellow of the Indian Academy of Sciences
- 1984 — Fellow of the Indian National Science Academy
- 1991 — Professor P Maheshwari Lecture Award of the Indian National Science Academy
- 1992 — Acharius Medal of the International Association of Lichenology
- 1993 — Honorary Member of the British Lichen Society
- 2011 — Dharani Dhar Awasthi Award established by the International Association for Lichenology to be given to a "prominent young researcher working and living in a low income country, who has completed a Ph.D. within five years prior to the submission deadline"

== Selected publications ==
=== Articles ===
- Awasthi, D.D. (1961). "Some foliose and fruticose lichens from Assam and North-East Frontier Agency of India". Proceedings of the Indian Academy of Sciences, Section B. 54 (24). doi:10.1007/BF03053852. S2CID 126891656.
- Awasthi, Dharani Dhar; Agarwal, Manjoo Rani (1968). "New or otherwise interesting lichens from Darjeeling District, India". Canadian Journal of Botany. 46 (8): 1025–1030. doi:10.1139/b68-136.
- Singh, K. P.; Awashti, D. D. (1979). "Lichen Genus Phaeographis from India and Sri Lanka". Nelumbo: The Bulletin of the Botanical Survey of India. 21 (1–4).
- Awasthi, Dharani Dhar (1981). "The Typification of Roccella montagnei". The Bryologist. 84 (2): 216–219. doi:10.2307/3242823. JSTOR 3242823.
- Awasthi, D. D. (1982). "Lichen genus Cetraria in India and Nepal". Nelumbo: The Bulletin of the Botanical Survey of India. 24 (1–4): 1–27.
- Awasthi, D.D.; Mathur, R. (1987). "Species of the lichen genera Basidia, Badimia, Fellhanera and Mycobilimbia". Proc. Indian Acad. Sci.: Plant Sciences. 97: 481–503. doi:10.1007/BF03053554. S2CID 91265256.
- Awasthi, Dharani Dhar; Srivastava, Preeti (1993). "New Species of Pertusaria (Lichenized Fungi) from India". The Bryologist. 96 (2): 210–215. doi:10.2307/3243803. JSTOR 3243803.

=== Books and monographs ===
- Awasthi, Dharani Dhar (1965). Catalogue of the lichens from India, Nepal, Pakistan, and Ceylon.
- —— (1991). A Key to the Microlichens of India, Nepal and Sri Lanka. J. Cramer. ISBN 9783443580193.
- —— (2000). A Hand Book of Lichens. Bishen Singh Mahendra Pal Singh. ISBN 9788121101813.
- —— (2000). Lichenology in Indian Subcontinent: A Supplement to "A Hand Book of Lichens". Bishen Singh Mahendra Pal Singh. ISBN 9788121101875.
- —— (2007). A Compendium of the Macrolichens from India, Nepal and Sri Lanka. Bishen Singh Mahendra Pal Singh. ISBN 9788121106009.

== See also ==
- Category:Taxa named by Dharani Dhar Awasthi
