= Hans Trass =

Estonian ecologist and botanist

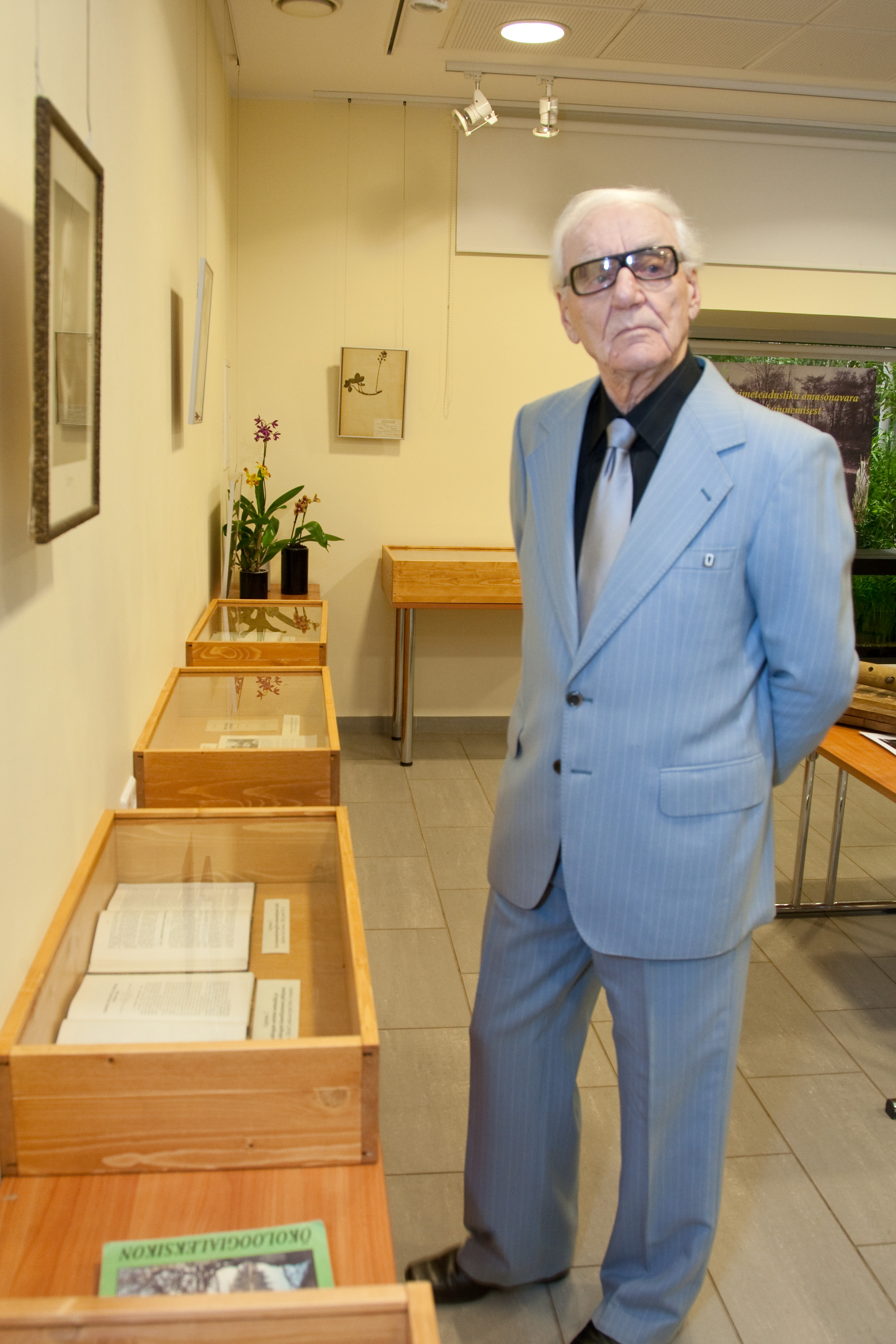
- Hans Trass 2009
- Born: 2 May 1928; Tartu, Estonia
- Died: 14 February 2017 (aged 88); Tartu, Estonia
- Scientific career
- Fields: Ecology, Botany

Hans-Voldemar Trass (2 May 1928 – 14 February 2017) was an Estonian ecologist and botanist. He was a member of the Estonian Academy of Sciences since 1975 and president of the Estonian Naturalists' Society from 1964 to 1973 and 1985 to 1991. In 1992, Trass was awarded the Acharius Medal by the International Association for Lichenology.

Trass was married to Estonian actress Raine Loo. The couple had a son, composer and organist Toomas Trass.

Trass died in Tartu, Estonia, on 14 February 2017, aged 88.
