= Henry Nicollon des Abbayes =

French botanist, lichenologist and plant collector (1898–1974)

Henry Robert Nicollon des Abbayes
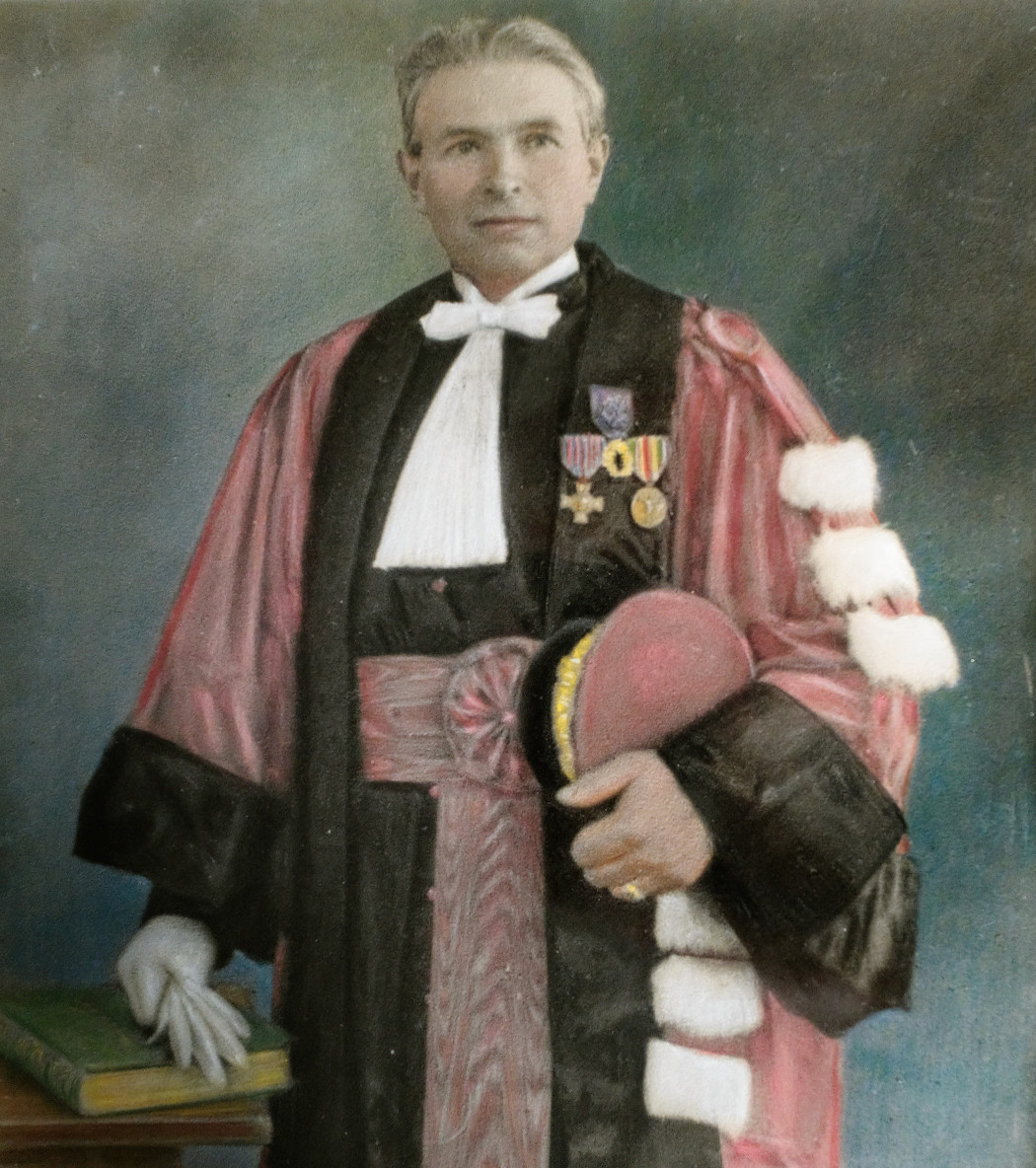
- Born: 15 July 1898
- Died: 21 May 1974 (aged 75); Rennes, France
- Scientific career
- Fields: Botany

Henry Robert Nicollon des Abbayes (15 July 1898 – 21 May 1974) was a French botanist and lichenologist. He was the chair of the Botanical Department of the University of Rennes and an expert on plants of Brittany and the flora of Great Britain. The standard author abbreviation Abbayes is used to indicate this person as the author when citing a botanical name.

H.R.N. des Abbayes was editor of four exsiccata series distributing lichen reference specimens among herbaria. In 1929 he started the first of these works devoted to lichens of Armorica with the title Lichenes Armoricani spectabiles exsiccati. Abbayes traveled around Madagascar and Réunion in the year 1956 collecting lichens and distributing specimens in the exsiccata Lichenes Madagascarienses et Borbonici exsiccati.
