= Roland Beschel =

Roland Ernst Beschel (9 August 1928, Salzburg, Austria – 22 January 1971, Kingston, Ontario) was an Austrian botanist, lichenologist, professor, and herbarium director, known for his famous doctoral thesis and subsequent research on lichenometry.

Beschel received in 1950 a doctorate in botany and physical geography from the University of Innsbruck, with a pioneering thesis on the ecology and growth of lichens and the use of lichen measurements to give dates for rock surface exposure.

He taught at the Institut auf dem Rosenberg in St. Gallen, Switzerland, until 1955, and then at Mount Allison University in New Brunswick.

In 1959 Beschel was appointed an assistant professor at Queen's University in Kingston, Ontario and the director of the Fowler Herbarium at Queen's. He was promoted to full professor at Queen's in 1969. The Fowler Herbarium is named after its founder James Fowler, a professor of natural history of Queen's, who retired in 1907 and had no successor as director of the herbarium until the appointment of Beschel in 1959.

An ardent believer in the fundamental importance of systematics in biology, Beschel not only restored Fowler's historic collection but completely revitalized the herbarium. Aided by assistant curators Garwood and Zavitz, he added almost 60,000 specimens to the herbarium, including extensive collections from the Canadian arctic, Greenland, Scandinavia and Russia.

Professor Beschel applied his knowledge of lichens broadly to problems of dating rock surfaces, estimating precipitation, and assessing air pollution around industrial centres. His work in North America emphasized arctic problems. He performed extensive field investigations in West Greenland, Baffin Island, interior Quebec, Ellesmere and Axel Heiberg islands, the Yellowknife area, and Alaska where he was visiting lecturer on the Juneau Icefield with the Glaciological Institute of Michigan State University.

He was elected a Fellow of the AAAS in 1965. He died suddenly at his home in Kingston at the age of 42. (His successor as director of the Fowler Herbarium was Adele Crowder.)
