= Edible lichen =

Iichens that are consumed by humans

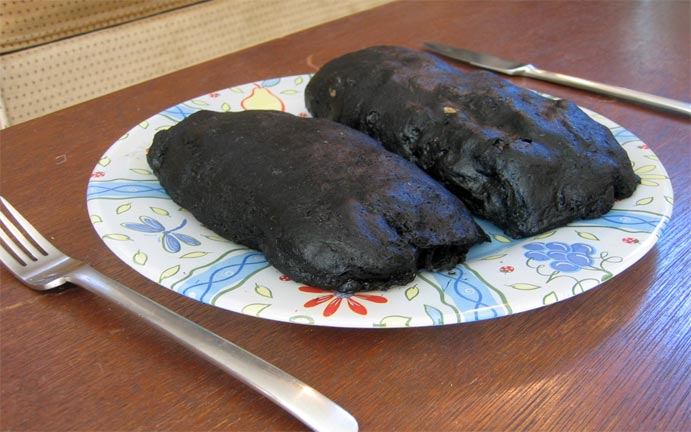
Two freshly cooked loaves of wila (Bryoria fremontii), an edible lichen that is an important traditional food for some indigenous peoples in North America

Edible lichens are lichens that have a cultural history of use as a food. Although almost all lichen are edible (with some notable poisonous exceptions like the wolf lichen, powdered sunshine lichen, and the ground lichen), not all have a cultural history of usage as an edible lichen. Often lichens are merely famine foods eaten in times of dire needs, but in some cultures lichens are a staple food or even a delicacy. Some lichens are a source of vitamin D.

== Uses ==
Although there are many lichen species throughout the world, only a few species of lichen are known to be both edible and provide any nutrition. Two problems often encountered with eating lichens are that they usually contain mildly toxic secondary compounds, and that lichen polysaccharides are generally indigestible to humans. Many human cultures have discovered preparation techniques to overcome these problems. Lichens are often thoroughly washed, boiled, or soaked in ash water to help remove secondary compounds.

Recent analytics within the field have identified 15 kinds of edible lichen, which have been mostly found in China. Due to its rubbery consistency, individuals within China fry, boil, and pressure-cook edible lichens. Further, edible lichens can be made into beverages such as tea.

In the past Iceland moss (Cetraria islandica) was an important human food in northern Europe and Scandinavia, and was cooked in many different ways, such as bread, porridge, pudding, soup, or salad. It is also fed to cattle, pigs and ponies. Bryoria fremontii was an important food in parts of North America, where it was usually pitcooked. It is even featured in a Secwepemc story. Northern peoples in North America and Siberia traditionally eat the partially digested lichen after they remove it from the rumen of caribou that have been killed. It is often called 'stomach icecream'. Rock tripe (Umbilicaria spp. and Lasallia spp.) is a lichen that has frequently been used as an emergency food in North America.

One species of Umbilicaria, Iwa-take (U. esculenta), is used in a variety of traditional Korean and Japanese foods. It is quite expensive, and is collected off the sides of cliffs.

In India, Parmotrema perlatum lichen is a popular ingredient of many spice mixes, such as garam masala, kaala masala and goda masala, bhojwar masala from Hyderabad and potli masala of Uttar Pradesh. The lichen is usually described as lacking in specific flavors or aromas by cooks, but via various cooking techniques it contributes to a rich aromatic profile and umami taste of many dishes.

Limbu and Rai people of northern Indian subcontinent consider several lichen species (with Hypotrachyna cirrhata (= Everniastrum cirrhatum), Hypotrachyna nepalensis(= Everniastrum nepalense), and Parmotrema cetratum being the preferred species) a delicacy and bulking agent. Ethnobotanists name the Limbu and Sherpa people as most lichenophilic in the region, compared to Brahmin, Chhetri and Tamang people. Sargyangma, a kind of sausage made up of minced pork, pork intestines, pork fat, pork's blood, eggs, lichen, rice and spices is a very popular Limbu dish.

Several large animals eat lichen, especially in winter when other food is scarce. Reindeer lichen (Cladonia spp.) is a staple food of reindeer and caribou in the Arctic. The golden snub-nosed monkey (Rhinopithecus roxellana) of northern China relies on lichen in winter months, eating leaves and other parts of plants during the rest of the year. The related species Black-and-white snub-nosed monkey (Rhinopithecus bieti) eats lichen, particularly Bryoria species and Usnea longissima, as their main food throughout the year.

== List of edible lichen ==
Examples of edible lichen, grouped by their families, include:

Cladoniaceae

- Cladonia spp.
  - Cladonia rangiferina — reindeer lichen (primarily in areas of alpine tundra)
  - Cladonia evansii

Parmeliaceae

- Cetraria islandica — Iceland moss (Alaska, Canada, Iceland, British Isles, Appalachian Mountains)
- Bryoria fremontii — wila
- Hypotrachyna cirrhata
- Hypotrachyna nepalensis
- Parmelia perlata — kalpasi or black stone flower (throughout temperate Northern and Southern hemispheres)
- Parmotrema cetratum
- Parmotrema perlatum
- Parmotrema reticulatum
- Parmotrema tinctorum

Peltigeraceae

- Lobaria sp.

Ramalinaceae

- Ramalina farinacea — farinose cartilage lichen
- Ramalina conduplicans

Umbilicariaceae

- Umbilicaria spp. — rock tripe
  - Umbilicaria esculenta — Iwa-take
- Lasallia spp.

== See also ==
- Ethnolichenology
