= Nina Golubkova =

Russian lichenologist

- Born: Нина Сергеевна Голубкова; 28 January 1932; Leningrad
- Died: 24 August 2009 (aged 77); Saint Petersburg
- Education: Leningrad State University
- Known for: Specimens retrieved during various Soviet expeditions
- Awards: Acharius Medal
- Scientific career
- Fields: Lichenology
- Workplaces: Komarov Botanical Institute
- Academic advisors: Vsevolod Savich
- Author abbrev. (botany): N.S.Golubk.

Nina Sergeevna Golubkova (Russian: Нина Сергеевна Голубкова) (28 January 1932 in Leningrad – 24 August 2009 in Saint Petersburg) was a Russian lichenologist.

In 1955, after graduating from Leningrad State University with a degree in mycology, Golubkova joined the Komarov Botanical Institute, where she worked under the supervision of Vsevolod Savich. In the 1960s, she studied specimens which had been retrieved during various Soviet expeditions to the Antarctic; her research on these samples led to multiple scientific publications and the identification of several new species. She also participated in specimen-collecting expeditions to the Pamir Mountains in Tajikistan, and to the steppes, taiga, and desert of Mongolia, and in 1978, she was a contributor to volume 5 of the Handbook of Lichens of the USSR.

In 1982, Golubkova was promoted to director of the Institute's Lichenology and Bryology Laboratory, a position she retained for over 20 years. In the aftermath of the dissolution of the Soviet Union, she arranged for the publication of volumes 6 through 10 of the now-renamed Handbook of Lichens of Russia, of which she served as editor-in-chief.

In 2000, Golubkova was awarded the Acharius Medal for lifetime achievements in lichenology.

Two lichen species, Chaenothecopsis golubkovae and Catillaria golubkovae, and the lichen genus Golubkovia, have been named in her honor.
