= Lichenometry =

Geomorphic method of geochronologic aging

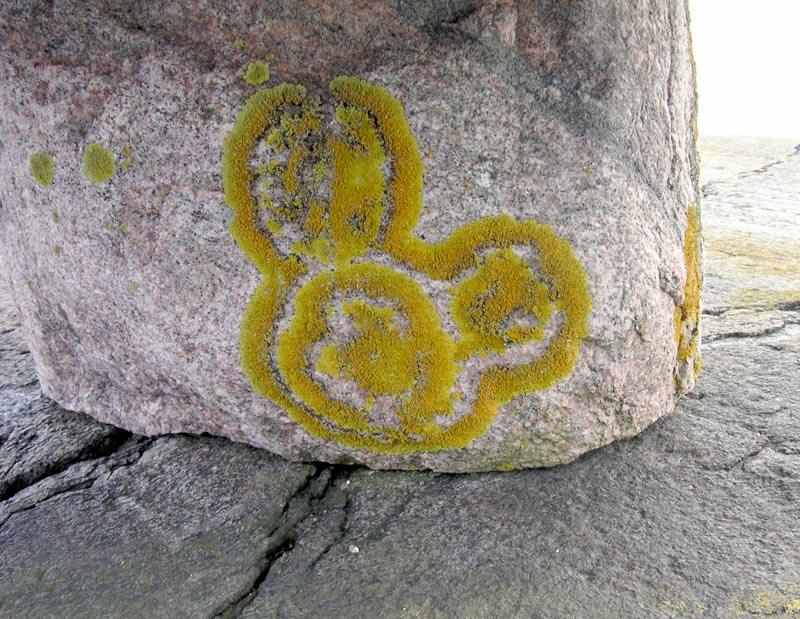
Lichen grown in a Mickey Mouse shape

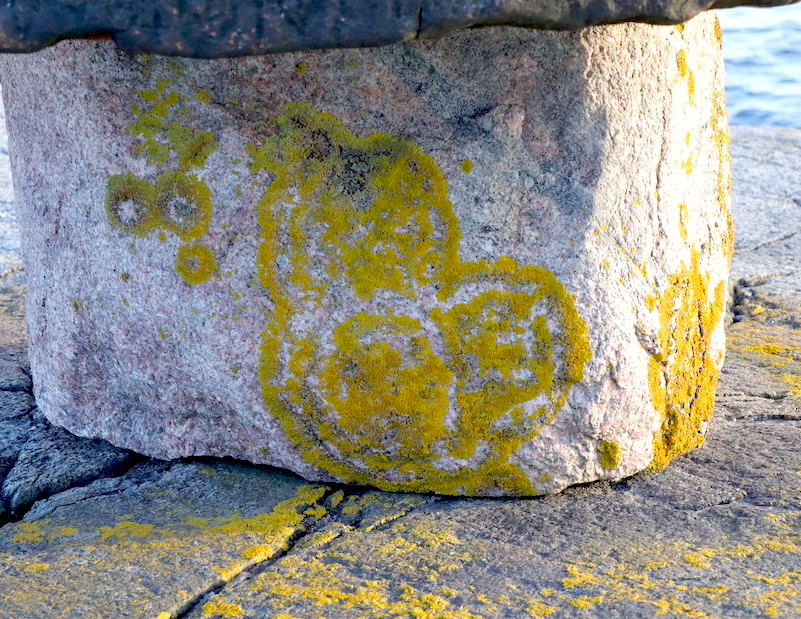
13 years later

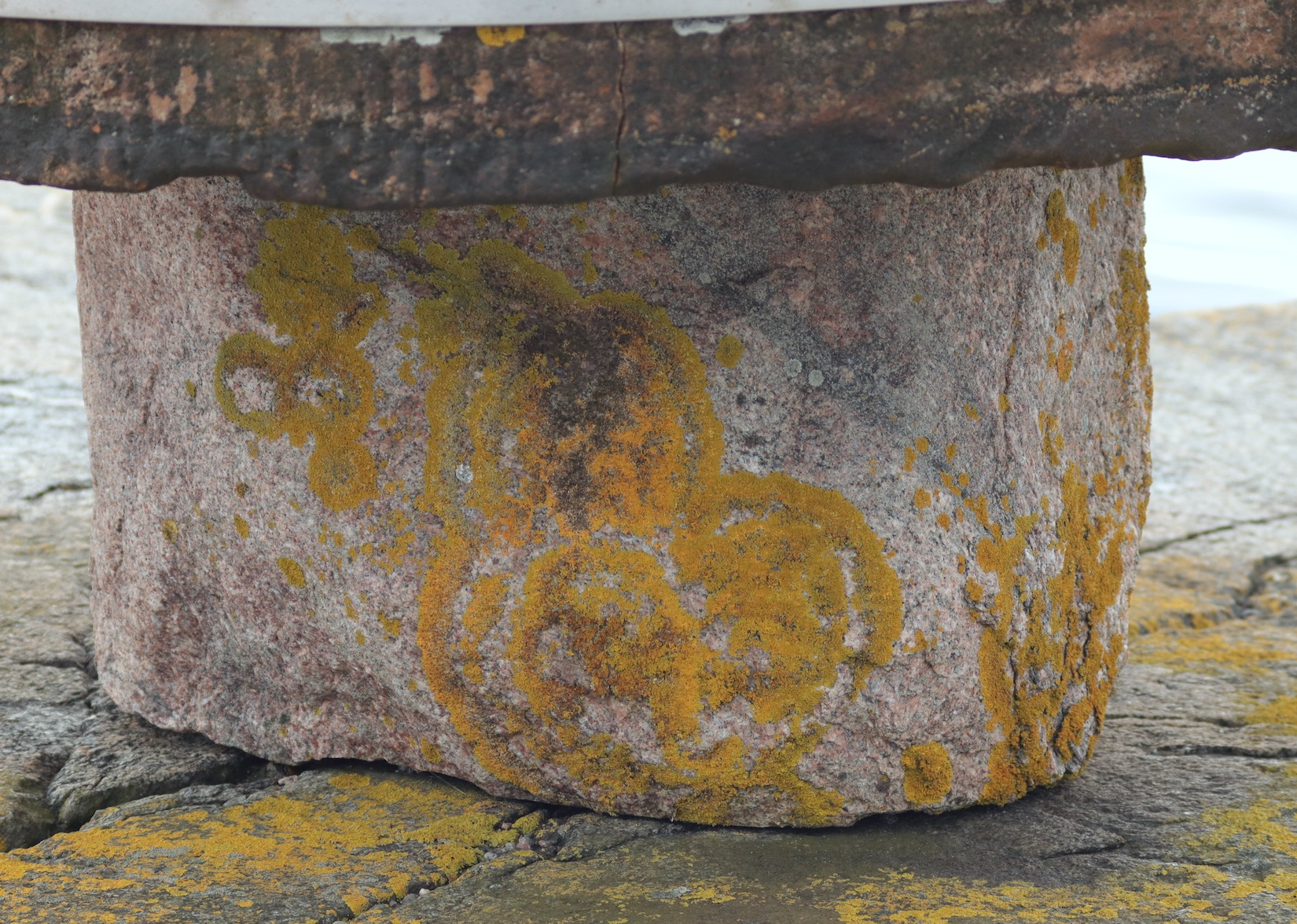
17 years later

In archaeology, palaeontology, and geomorphology, lichenometry is a geomorphic method of geochronologic dating that uses lichen growth to determine the age of exposed rock, based on a presumed specific rate of increase in radial size over time. Measuring the diameter of the largest lichen of a species on a rock surface can therefore be used to determine the length of time the rock has been exposed. Lichen can be preserved on old rock faces for up to 10,000 years, providing the maximum age limit of the technique, but it is most accurate (within 10% error) when applied to surfaces that have been exposed for less than 1,000 years. (The practical limit of the technique might be 4,000 to 5,000 years.)

Lichenometry is especially useful for dating surfaces less than 500 years old, as radiocarbon dating techniques are less accurate over this period. The lichens most commonly used for lichenometry are those of the genera Rhizocarpon (such as the species Rhizocarpon geographicum) and Xanthoria. The measured growth rates of R. geographicum tends to fall within the range of 0.9–0.3 millimeter per year, depending on several factors, including the size of the lichen patch.

The technique was first employed by Knut Fægri in 1933, though the first exclusively lichenometric paper was not published until 1950, by Austrian Roland Beschel, in a paper concerning the European Alps.

== Scope and limitations ==
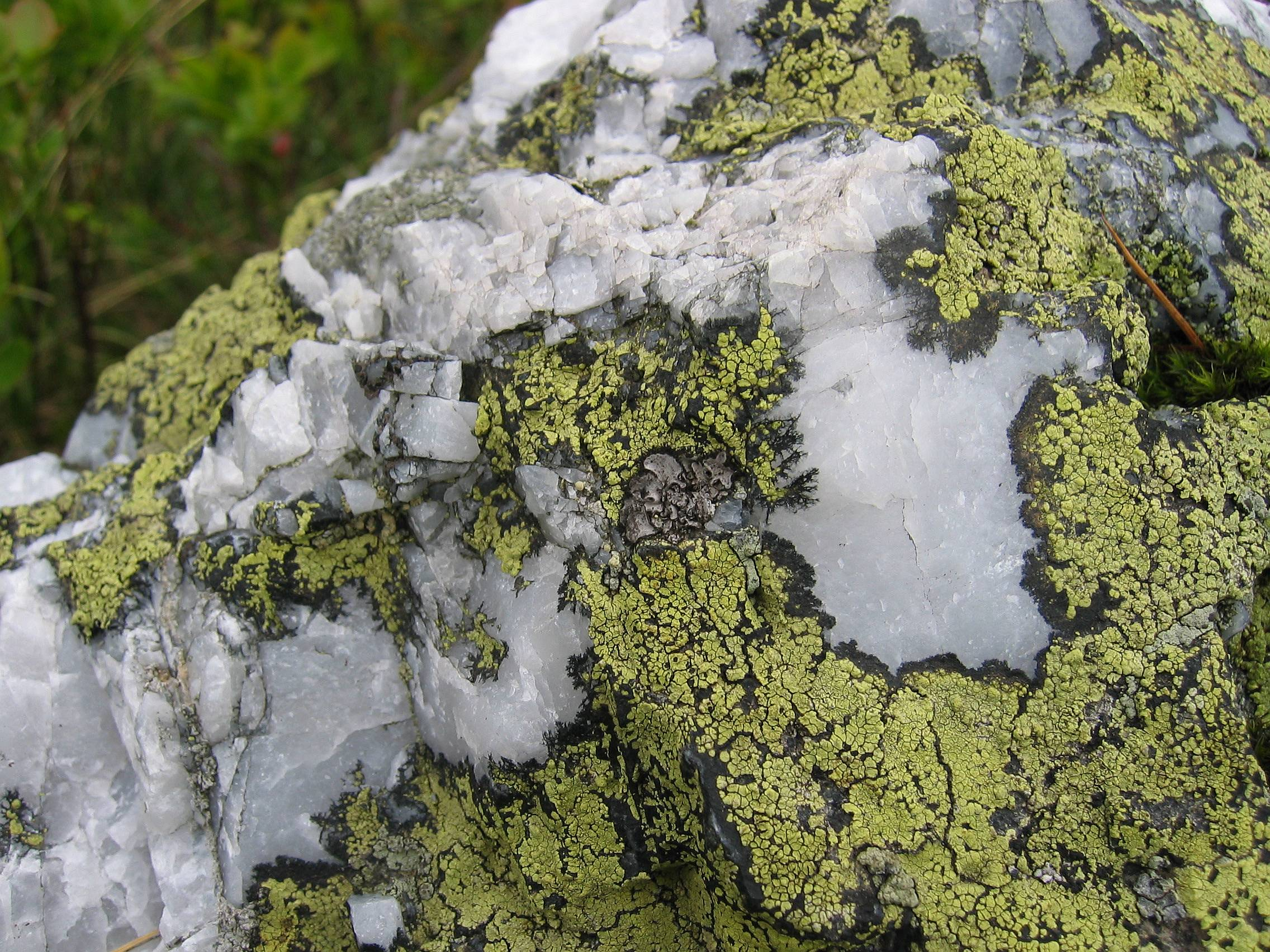
The map lichen (Rhizocarpon geographicum), the lichen most used in lichenometry

Lichenometry can provide dates for glacial deposits in tundra environments, lake level changes, glacial moraines, trim lines, palaeofloods, rockfalls, seismic events associated with the rockfalls, talus (scree) stabilization and former extent of permafrost or very persistent snow cover. It has also been explored as a tool in assessing the speed of glacier retreat due to climate change.

Among the potential problems of the technique are the difficulty of correctly identifying the species, the delay between exposure and colonization, the varying growth rates from region to region, growth rates not always being constant over time and depend on substrate texture and composition, the climate, and determining the lichen that is the largest.

== Methods ==
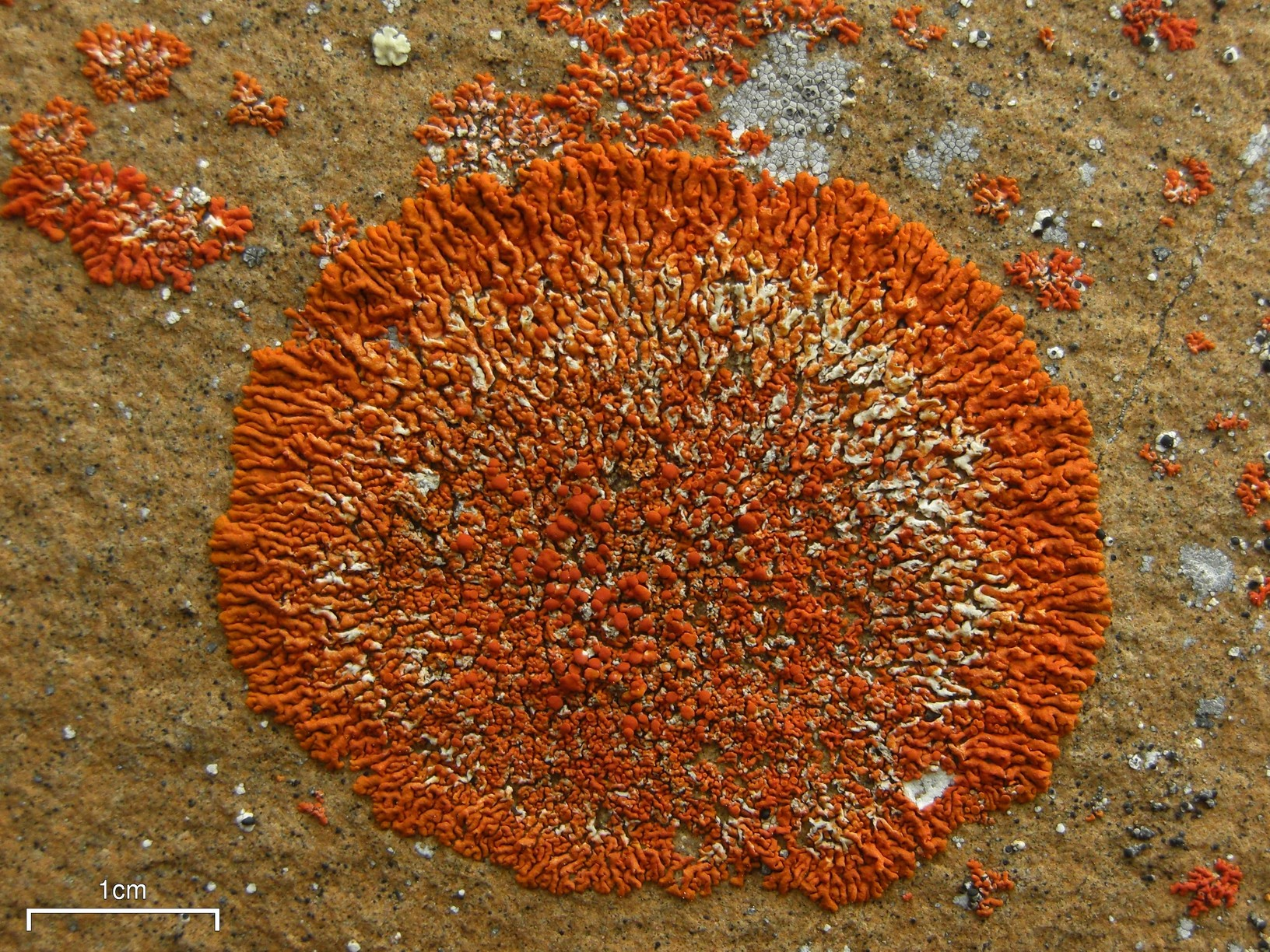
Rusavskia elegans was one of the first lichens used for lichenometry.

Several methods exist for dating surfaces with help of lichenometry; the most simple relies on a single largest lichen though other methods use more. There are also differences in the way the lichen is measured; some scientists suggest that the largest diameter should be measured, but others prefer the diameter of the largest inscribed circle. A problem in dating lichens is the fact that several thalli can fuse together, making several minor lichens appears as a larger one of older age. The lichenometrist Tom Bradwell has listed the following five method families as the principal ones into which most other methods can be classified:

- Largest lichen (LL): When the single largest lichen of a species is used it means that the lichen that is oldest or grows in most favorable conditions is used to date the minimum age of the exposed surface. This was the original lichenometric from which others then developed or used as reference. Despite relying upon a single lichen this technique is praised for its simplicity and allows obtaining an image of the age of rock exposure while still in the field.
- Largest five lichens (5LL): This method is a development of the LL and was developed in the 1970s to avoid reliance on one single potentially anomalous lichen. It has been proved that neither accuracy nor precision improves significantly by having more than five lichens.
- Fixed-area largest lichen (FALL): This technique was initially specially designed for dating rockfalls and talus cones with no uniform age of deposition. The largest thallus in a unit area is measured. The sample areas are usually boulders with surfaces of about 1 m^{2}.
- Size-frequency approach (SF): The analysis of size and frequency of lichens was initially done in order to study lichen populations and preexisting thalli growing on surfaces, but has since been used as an effective absolute and relative dating method.
- Lichen cover approach (LC): This method works with the premise of that the area covered by a single species will increase over time, and by measuring the total area percentage covered by a certain lichen species the age of exposure can be inferred.

== Criticism ==
Lichenometry has been criticized for the high variability of its methods across different papers and the application of methods calibrated in one regime to very different regions or search processes, as well as the low replicability of its growth curves and the extrapolation of data on the basis of very few observations. Osborn et al. conclude that "the logical conclusion is that no assumption of good ages can be made, and that it is folly to assign numerical ages to a deposit on the basis of lichen sizes."
