= Ramalina conduplicans =

Scientific classification
- Kingdom: Fungi
- Division: Ascomycota
- Class: Lecanoromycetes
- Order: Lecanorales
- Family: Ramalinaceae
- Genus: Ramalina
- Species: R. conduplicans

Binomial name
- Ramalina conduplicans Vain. (1921)

Species of lichen-forming fungus

Ramalina conduplicans is an edible lichen. It has antioxidant properties in laboratory experiments.

== See also ==
- List of Ramalina species
