= International Association for Lichenology =

Organization for studying and conserving lichens

The International Association for Lichenology (IAL) is an organisation that encourages the understanding of lichens and lichenology, and promotes their study and conservation worldwide. It unites lichenologists across the globe, as well as national and regional organisations into one group. The IAL is affiliated to the International Union of Biological Sciences (IUBS).

The association grew out of discussions at International Botanical Congresses in the 1950s and 1960s. In 1967, Vernon Ahmadjian and Irwin Brodo launched the International Lichenological Newsletter, which became the practical centre of the nascent organisation, and in 1969 IAL was formally recognised at the 11th International Botanical Congress in Seattle. For its first decade the association relied on voluntary effort and an informal structure; a constitution was not circulated until 1980.

The IAL organises international symposia, the largest regular meetings in the field, alongside field excursions in regions ranging from the Austrian Alps to Costa Rica and southern Africa. It administers several awards, including the Acharius Medal for lifetime achievement in lichenology. Through committees on lichen terminology and conservation, the association has also served as a forum for professional consensus on foundational questions, including the formal definition of a lichen. Although its membership was long centred in western Europe and North America, the IAL has gradually broadened its geographical reach, with increasing attention to tropical and Southern Hemisphere research.

== History ==
International co-operation among lichenologists long predated the formal establishment of IAL. Lichen papers and excursions had appeared at earlier International Botanical Congresses, including Stockholm in 1950 and Paris in 1954, but the 10th congress in Edinburgh in 1964 brought together an especially active group of workers and demonstrated that the field needed a more regular means of communication. There, a small group approved a motion to establish an international association and also proposed a newsletter that could circulate news of current research, meetings and workers more quickly than conventional publications. Rolf Santesson, Peter James and Vernon Ahmadjian were appointed to move the plan forward, but progress was slow at first. Real momentum came in April 1967, when Ahmadjian, with Irwin Brodo as associate editor, issued the first mimeographed International Lichenological Newsletter, which soon became the practical centre of the new organization.

The association was formally recognized at the 11th International Botanical Congress in Seattle in 1969, when the General Assembly of the IUBS acknowledged IAL and its first executive council was elected. Peter James, one of the association's founders, became IAL's first president at the Seattle congress in 1969 and remained in that role until 1975. He was succeeded by Teuvo Ahti, who served as president from 1975 to 1981 and was later named honorary president in 1996. In these early years the newsletter did more than carry announcements: it published editorials and short reports that traced lichenology's expansion beyond traditional systematics into physiology, chemistry, ecology and other fields. The young association also began to define itself through meetings and field work. A lichenological meeting in Berlin in 1970, the first independent IAL excursion in the Austrian Alps in 1973, and the influential Bristol meeting of 1974 all helped bring together researchers from different countries and traditions. At the same time, IAL remained administratively fragile, relying heavily on voluntary labour and still lacking a constitution.

IAL became more firmly established in the late 1970s and 1980s. A new council elected after the Leningrad congress revitalized the organization, while later excursions and meetings, including the Costa Rica field trip of 1978–79 and the symposium on tropical lichens at the Natural History Museum, London in 1989, broadened its geographical outlook and drew attention to the under-representation of tropical regions within the membership. After more than a decade of informal operation, a draft constitution was finally circulated in 1980, giving the association a clearer independent identity at a time when its relationship with wider mycological bodies was still being debated. By the early 1990s, with its own regular symposia, a stronger council structure and its own awards, IAL had developed from a loosely organized network centred on a newsletter into a stable international association capable of organizing major meetings in its own right.

== Structure and activities ==
=== International Lichenological Newsletter ===
The International Lichenological Newsletter has been a principal means of communication for IAL members since the association's early years. A contemporary overview published in 1974 stated that the newsletter had been founded in April 1967 by Ahmadjian, Brodo and Hale to help lichenologists keep abreast of one another's work and opinions. Initially edited by Ahmadjian and Brodo, it later evolved in both format and content, serving as a forum for lichenologists to exchange ideas, report research projects, and share news of meetings and social events.

=== Symposia and field trips ===
The IAL organises field courses and excursions, as well as symposia which are the largest events in lichenology on the international level.

The first IAL excursion took place in the Austrian Alps in September 1973, led by Josef Poelt and Maximillian Steiner. This was followed by other meetings, including a joint meeting with the British Lichen Society at the University of Bristol in 1974, which set the course for future IAL meetings.

The IAL has also played a role in promoting tropical lichenology. In 1989, a symposium on "Tropical Lichens" was held at the Natural History Museum, London. The fourth IAL symposium, held at the University of Barcelona from 3 to 8 September 2000, brought together lichenologists from around the world to discuss current directions in the field. A later review of the proceedings described the meeting as a forum for lively exchange on recent concepts in lichenological research, noting that the published volume covered a broad range of work extending beyond the symposium itself. Although systematics and phylogeny had figured strongly in the meeting programme, the proceedings also gave substantial attention to bioindication and biogeography, illustrating the disciplinary breadth of lichenology at the turn of the millennium.

The 5th Symposium of the International Association for Lichenology, held in Tartu, Estonia, from 16 to 21 August 2004 under the theme "Lichens in Focus", drew 250 registered participants from 36 countries. Its programme included six scientific sessions, three discussion sessions, 65 lectures and 153 posters, as well as an opening lecture by Angela Douglas. Field work remained an important part of the meeting: 64 participants joined three excursions in different parts of Estonia, and material collected during them yielded 30 species of lichens or lichenicolous fungi newly recorded for the country.

A summary of all of the IAL meetings and symposia:

- 1973: First IAL excursion in the Austrian Alps
- 1974: Joint meeting with the British Lichen Society in Bristol, UK (not officially an IAL symposium, but significant for future IAL meetings)
- 1978/79: Second IAL excursion to Costa Rica
- 1986: Third IAL excursion to South Africa and Namibia
- 1986: Symposium "Progress and Problems in Lichenology in the Eighties" in Münster, Germany (referred to as IAL 1)
- 1989: Symposium on "Tropical Lichens" at the Natural History Museum, London, UK
- 1992: IAL 2 in Lund, Sweden
- 2000: IAL 4 in Barcelona, Spain
- 2004: IAL 5 in Tartu, Estonia
- 2008: IAL 6 in Monterey, California, USA
- 2012: IAL 7 in Bangkok, Thailand
- 2016: IAL 8 in Helsinki, Finland
- 2021: IAL 9 held online due to the COVID-19 pandemic
- 2026: IAL 10 to be held in Trieste, Italy 26–30 July

=== Awards ===
The IAL currently hands out four awards to recognise significant contributions made to lichenology:

The Acharius Medal is awarded to distinguished lichenologists in recognition of their lifetime achievements. Recipients have included David Hawksworth (2002), Nina Golubkova (2000), Vernon Ahmadjian (1996), Irwin Brodo (1994), William Culberson (1992), Aino Henssen (1992), Hildur Krog (1992) and Hans Trass (1992).

The Mason Hale Award is granted in recognition of excellence in research by young lichenologists, such as doctoral dissertations.

The Margalith Galun Award is presented for outstanding student contributions to an IAL meeting.

The Sylvia Sharnoff Education Award is given to an outstanding web page devoted to lichens.

=== Committees and definitions ===
The IAL developed committees as part of its effort to give the young association a more active role in shaping the field rather than merely reporting on it. Around the time of the general meeting held in connection with the Second International Mycological Congress in Tampa, the president appointed both a Lichen Terminology Committee and a Lichen Conservation Committee. Their creation reflected changes already under way within lichenology, which was no longer confined mainly to taxonomy but had become increasingly engaged with ecology, symbiosis, physiology and broader biological questions. In that setting, the association began to treat matters of language, concepts and preservation as subjects that deserved collective discussion rather than being left entirely to individual workers.

The Lichen Terminology Committee, chaired by Ahmadjian, later presented a definition developed from votes by IAL members: "A lichen is an association of a fungus and a photosynthetic symbiont resulting in a stable thallus of specific structure". Ingvar Kärnefelt and Arne Thell describe this formulation as an advance on earlier attempts, because it tied the partnership not only to symbiosis but also to the formation of a distinctive and persistent thallus. The committee's work showed that IAL was beginning to serve as a forum for professional consensus on foundational questions in lichenology. The Lichen Conservation Committee represented a parallel concern with the future of lichens in nature, giving the association a more explicit role in discussions about the protection of species and habitats. The International Committee for Conservation of Lichens was established during the second IAL symposium (Båstad, Sweden) in 1992, and in 1994 became a specialist group under the umbrella of the Species Survival Commission (SSC) at the International Union for Conservation of Nature.

== Global reach ==
Although the IAL began with a membership centred mainly in western Europe and North America, it increasingly served as an international forum for lichenologists in many parts of the world. Through the International Lichenological Newsletter, members circulated reports on research, developing projects and events from a widening geographical range, including China, the Guianas, Australia and Central Asia. Field excursions and meetings also helped extend the association's international character, bringing together participants from numerous countries and drawing greater attention to lichen floras outside the traditional European and North American centres of research.

At the same time, the early record described by Kärnefelt and Thell makes clear that this global reach was uneven. In 1977, most members still came from western Europe and North America, while South America was only sparsely represented. By 1990, 379 of the association's 440 members were of European or North American origin, and only 10 represented tropical regions. The 1989 symposium on tropical lichens helped bring that imbalance into sharper focus, linking the association's expanding international ambitions with a more explicit concern for tropical research and representation. A further sign of the association's widening reach came with IAL9: although the 2020 symposium was originally planned as the first South American IAL meeting, the pandemic forced it online, and the virtual conference nevertheless drew 375 registered participants from 46 countries, a record for an IAL symposium.
