= British Lichen Society =

Learned society specialising in lichens

- Formation: 1958
- Legal status: Not-for-profit organisation
- Purpose: The promotion of the study, conservation and appreciation of lichens especially in relation to the British Isles
- Location(s): London, WC1X; United Kingdom
- Region served: Worldwide

The British Lichen Society (BLS) was founded in 1958 with the objective of promoting the study and conservation of lichen. Although the society was founded in London, UK, it is of relevance to lichens worldwide. It has been a registered charity (number 228850) since 1964.

== History ==
Prior to the Society's formation, discussions were held with both the British Bryological Society and the British Mycological Society about potentially establishing a lichen section within one of these existing organisations. However, these talks were unsuccessful; the British Mycological Society offered lichenologists only two pages at the end of their journal, while a joint meeting with bryologists revealed that productive sites for lichens rarely coincided with those favoured by bryologists.

At the instigation of Dougal Swinscow, the first meeting of the society was held at the British Museum on 1 February 1958; there were 24 attendees from 60 invited. Twenty-five people (2 women and 23 men) attended this inaugural meeting and almost unanimously voted to form a society called the British Lichen Society. The alternative name "British Lichenological Society" was suggested by Fred Sowter but attracted only a single vote. The meeting appointed officers and referees, and agreed to publish both a journal, The Lichenologist, and a cyclostyled Bulletin. Several positions were decided: Arthur Edward Wade was elected as the secretary, Peter Wilfred James as the editor and recorder, Joseph Peterken as the treasurer, David Smith the librarian, and Swinscow as curator and assistant editor. Others at the founding meeting were David Bellamy, Brenda Haynes, Frank Brightman and Geoffrey Dobbs. Another founder was Ursula Katherine Duncan.

The Society's first field meeting, attended by eighteen members, was held a year later in Chelsford, Devon. An existing Lichen Study Group, which had been run by Freddie Sowter from Leicester since 1953, was incorporated into the new society. This group had circulated parcels of named specimens belonging to a single genus or consisting of closely related species among participants.

A tenth-anniversary symposium, held jointly with the British Mycological Society, was held on 27 September 1968. In 1983, the BLS held its silver jubilee celebrations to commemorate 25 years since its founding. A one-day lichenology symposium was held at the Natural History Museum, London, covering the topics ecophysiology, ecology, and lichenology in the Southern Hemisphere.

Lichenologist Oliver Gilbert, former president of the BLS and editor of the organisation’s publications, wrote the book The Lichen Hunters in 2004; according to the blurb on the dust jacket, it is "part travelogue and part social history of the British Lichen Society from ... 1958 to the present".

== Activities and publications ==
The early services offered to BLS members included an annual journal of around fifty pages, a twice-yearly Bulletin covering a single sheet, membership of the Lichen Reading Circle, the Lichen Study Group, access to referees for identification assistance, and field meetings. The first two volumes of The Lichenologist were cyclostyled with text typed by Swinscow's secretary.

A series of events are held each year led by members of the society. These include field and indoor meetings and training events. The Society quickly established a programme of field meetings, with early meetings drawing attendance of eighteen to twenty-eight people. By 1963, the programme had established a pattern of a week-long spring meeting, a fortnight summer meeting often with two venues, and a weekend autumn meeting. These meetings, frequently led by Peter James, resulted in major fieldwork and new discoveries, including the identification of nine species new to Britain during the 1963 Killin/Kinlochewe trip.

In conjunction and with support from the BLS, the Field Studies Council started giving field courses on lichens in 1958, initially led by Arthur Wade and held at the Malham Tarn Field Studies Centre. These annual field courses had actually begun in 1955, with Jack Laundon recommending Arthur Wade as a suitable leader to the warden, Paul Holmes. The courses introduced many future leading lichenologists to the subject and helped build momentum towards the establishment of the Society. These courses helped increase awareness and interest in field lichenology in the British Isles. In 1964, the BLS undertook the Society Distribution Maps Scheme, a major citizen science project led by Mark Seaward. This effort ultimately resulted in the 1970 publication Introduction to British Lichens, after which it became possible to reliably identify most lichens found in the UK. Distribution maps of species were distributed in the October 1973 issue of The Lichenologist, and this data was incorporated into other biogeographical lichen research, including studies on the effects of pollution on local lichen populations. The society also makes grants to support projects that study lichens. It works with other organisations.

The Society publishes a scientific journal, The Lichenologist, that focusses on the taxonomy of lichens as well as their ecology and physiology. It was founded by Dougal Swinscow and edited by Peter Wilfred James from 1958 until 1977 and by Peter Crittenden from 2000 to 2016.

There is also a twice-yearly members' bulletin, BLS Bulletin. Jack Laundon took over the Bulletin from Arthur Wade in 1963, when it was still a one-page news-sheet containing information about meetings, subscription rates, and other society matters. Under his editorship, the Bulletin gradually expanded, with Laundon adding articles of general interest and humorous pieces. In 1972, he introduced a lead article with a black and white photograph, and increased the page count to around twenty. After sixteen years as editor, Laundon passed the role to Oliver Gilbert. This was edited by Gilbert from 1980 until 1989 (except not 1987).

In the 1990s, following the publication of the comprehensive Lichen Flora of Great Britain and Ireland and increased awareness of biodiversity following the Rio Convention, the Society saw a transition in activity. Many members became involved in professional lichen consultancy work for conservation organisations, heritage authorities, and government agencies.

The society also maintains a database of the lichens in England and Wales, a library based at the National Botanic Garden of Wales, and a herbarium.

== Presidents ==
The BLS elects a new president every two years:

- 1959–1962 David Catcheside
- 1962–1964 Dougal Swinscow
- 1964–1966 Arthur Wade
- 1966–1968 Joseph Peterken
- 1968–1970 Geoffrey Dobbs
- 1970–1972 Peter James
- 1972–1974 David Smith
- 1974–1976 Dennis Brown
- 1976–1978 Oliver Gilbert
- 1978–1980 Frank Brightman
- 1980–1982 Francis Rose
- 1982–1984 Mark Seaward
- 1984–1986 Jack Laundon
- 1986–1988 David Hawksworth
- 1988–1990 Brian Coppins
- 1990–1992 David Richardson
- 1992–1994 Frank Dobson
- 1994–1996 Brian Fox
- 1996–1998 Ray Woods
- 1998–2000 Peter Crittenden
- 2000–2002 Tony Fletcher
- 2002–2004 Sandy Coppins
- 2004–2006 David Hill
- 2006–2008 Pat Wolseley
- 2008–2010 Peter Lambley
- 2010–2012 Stephen Ward
- 2012–2014 Barbara Hilton
- 2014–2016 Janet Simkin
- 2016–2018 Allan Pentecost
- 2018–2020 Paul Cannon
- 2020–2022 Rebecca Yahr
- 2022–Current (April 2024) Fay Newbery
