= Ursula Katherine Duncan =

British botanist

- Born: 17 September 1910
- Died: 27 January 1985 (aged 74)
- Scientific career
- Fields: botany

Ursula Katherine Duncan (17 September 1910 – 27 January 1985) was an English botanist with a special interest in mosses and lichens, and a lifelong love and knowledge of flowers. She was entirely self-educated in botany, and corresponded with numerous professional and amateur colleagues, who contributed to her scientific development. She published on bryology, lichenology and vascular plants. The University of Dundee awarded her an honorary doctorate in 1969 for her work as a plant taxonomist and soon after, she was chosen to receive the Linnaean Society's H. H. Bloomer Award for 1973. As well as pursuing her botanical interests, she took charge of the Duncan family's Scottish estate.

== Early life and family ==
She was born on 17 September 1910 in Kensington to Dorothy Duncan née Weston and Commander John Alexander Duncan CB RN. The family, including her younger sister Frances, lived in London when the girls were little but moved to their estate at Parkhill near Arbroath when she was nine. Soon after that she started to take an interest in plants, accompanying her father on expeditions to study flowers, and joining the Wild Flower Society. She had a governess for a time, but studied independently too, getting a distinction in classics when she took her School Certificate exams at 15. Later, she followed this up with independent study leading to external degrees in classics from the University of London: a BA in 1952 and MA in 1956. She was also a talented pianist with a good grasp of music theory, and qualified as LRAM.

Her mother was born Beatrice Dorothy Percy Weston. Her father had a successful naval career as a senior officer. In the year Ursula Duncan was born he started a War Office job in London, from which he retired in 1919. For much of his daughter's life he was a locally prominent landowner with a specialist interest in breeding Suffolk sheep. Frances Louise was Mrs. Frances Gunner at the time of her sister's death.

During the Second World War Duncan worked in Inverness for the Censorship Department, until her family situation changed suddenly in August 1943. Less than a week after her sister married and moved away, her father died. She took on overall managerial responsibility for the extensive family landholding she inherited, which included 600 acres of farmland. This generated an income which allowed her to pursue her interests.

== Botany ==
=== Mosses ===
In 1931 she joined the Botanical Society of the British Isles and in 1938 joined the British Bryological Society, of which she was made an honorary member in 1980. Sphagnum species were a particular interest, and Duncan became a leading mid-20th century British authority on these. She drew up distribution maps and contributed significantly to records of new sightings: for instance, she found mosses that had not been noted since the 19th century, like Grimmia unicolor and Bryum dixonii.

Her correspondence with other bryologists helped her initially when John Bishop Duncan encouraged her studies, and then she became known as a generous, knowledgeable and conscientious correspondent with her botanical friends and acquaintances, including people who asked for help with identifying specimens.

Her obituarist in the Journal of Bryology, Dr. E.V. Watson, thought the following were her most important writings on the subject.

- 1956 A bryophyte flora of Wigtownshire. Trans. Br. bryol. Soc. 3, 50-63.
- 1960 A survey of the bryophytes and lichens of 'The Burn', Kincardine, Trans. Proc. bot. Soc. Edinb. 39, 62-84.
- 1962 Illustrated Key to Sphagnum mosses. Trans. Proc. bot. Soc. Edinb. 39, 290-301.
- 1962 The bryophytes and lichens of the Loch Tay area. Rep. Scott. Fld. Stud. Ass. 1962, 20-31.
- 1966 The bryophytes of the Kindrogan area. Rep. Scott. Fld. Stud. Ass., 1966, 10-16.
- 1966 The bryophyte flora of Angus. Trans. Br. bryol. Soc. 5, 1-82.

=== Lichens ===
Duncan took up lichenology after being introduced to the subject by Walter Watson and R.H. Burn. Lichenology was not thriving in the UK of the 1940s and '50s. She played an important role in reawakening interest in lichens, through her courses at the Kindrogan field centre, her contributions at British Lichen Society field meetings and books about lichen identification. She was a founder member of the British Lichen Society and contributed many of the Scottish records in Watson's Census Catalogue of British Lichens (1953). She wrote the following books:

- 1959 A Guide to the Study of Lichens, Arbroath: T. Buncle & Co.
- 1963 Lichen Illustrations. Supplement, etc., Arbroath: T. Buncle & Co.
- 1970 Introduction to British lichens, with P. W. James, Arbroath: T. Buncle & Co.

=== Flowers and other vascular plants ===
Some friends claimed Duncan loved flowers above all other plants, and she enjoyed gardening at Parkhill. She had a special interest in the floras of her home county of Angus and also of East Ross-shire and Mull. Her work in Mull helped initiate a British Museum project on the flora of Mull.

- 1980 Flora of East Ross-Shire, [Edinburgh] : Botanical Society of Edinburgh

== Legacy ==
When she did field work with others, she encouraged beginners and shared her knowledge and enthusiasm with them as she did with experienced naturalists too. Her obituaries describe her walking vigorously over hilly ground in wild countryside seeking out interesting specimens: "tireless tramping". Outdoor work, teaching and writing were among Duncan's great strengths. She refused opportunities to join formal committees, and when she was given her doctorate she never used the title Dr. She was a Fellow of the Linnaean Society (FLS) as well as being honoured with their H. H. Bloomer award in 1973.

Duncan made significant contributions to lichenology as an amateur scientist while managing her family farm in Arbroath, Scotland. She was one of the contributors to the inaugural volume of the journal The Lichenologist in 1958, and has been credited alongside Arthur Wade, Frederick Archibald Sowter, and Walter Watson with keeping lichenology alive in Britain during the 1940s and 1950s. Her most enduring contribution to the field was her book Introduction to British Lichens (1970), which provided both novice and experienced lichenologists with a detailed yet accessible guide for identifying all but the rarest British lichens. This work became foundational for subsequent multi-authored British lichen identification guides. Duncan's illustrations were complemented by line drawings from Kenneth A. Kershaw and Dougal Swinscow, demonstrating the collaborative nature of her work in advancing lichen taxonomy and identification resources. The British Lichen Society introduced 'The Ursula Duncan Award' in her memory in 2002. It is given to those who have made outstanding service to the society.

Shortly before her death at Arbroath on 27 January 1985 her sizeable collection of vascular plants with taxonomic significance was given to the Dundee Museum. The Royal Botanic Garden Edinburgh has her cryptogam collection including important lichen records and other material.
