= Oliver Gilbert (lichenologist) =

British lichenologist and urban ecologist

Oliver Lathe Gilbert
- Born: Lancaster; 7 September 1936
- Died: 15 May 2005 (aged 68)
- Education: Newcastle University
- Spouse: Daphne Broughton (divorce)
- Children: 3
- Scientific career
- Fields: urban ecology; lichenology; landscape ecology
- Workplaces: Newcastle University; University of Sheffield
- Author abbrev. (botany): O.L.Gilbert

Oliver Lathe Gilbert (7 September 1936 – 15 May 2005) was a British urban ecologist and lichenologist. He was a reader in landscape ecology at Sheffield University. He was one of the early users of lichens as indicators of air pollution, and also studied the ecology and diversity of wildlife in urban areas.

== Early life and education ==
Oliver Lathe Gilbert and his twin brother Christopher were born in Lancaster. His parents were Ruth (nee Ainsworth) who wrote books for children, and Frank Gilbert, managing director of Durham Chemicals. One of his uncles was the mycologist Geoffrey Clough Ainsworth. The family soon moved to London and he attended the private co-educational boarding school St George's School, Harpenden. As a child he became interested in plants, and rock climbing. He studied botany at University of Exeter and was especially interested in mosses and liverworts. He then studied fungal diseases of plants at Imperial College, London, and took up a post as deputy warden at Malham Tarn Field Studies Centre. Here, he was inspired by Arthur Edward Wade to study lichens. While employed at University of Newcastle upon Tyne, he started research for a PhD degree on the subject of Biological Indicators of Air Pollution which was awarded in 1970.

== Career ==
In 1963 he was employed by University of Newcastle upon Tyne as a demonstrator. He carried out research into the distribution and effects of air pollution on lichens and mosses and showed that their diversity reduced in moving from countryside to industrial urban areas. He moved to University of Sheffield as a lecturer in landscape ecology in 1968 and was promoted to reader in 1986. He retired in 1993 but continued as a part-time tutor until 2000.

He learnt how to identify the lichen flora of the British Isles in the 1960s and went on many field visits to record more unusual species, and their locations in more remote parts of the country. In 1970 he began a systematic survey of lichen in the Cheviots that lasted for several decades. He also led surveys of the lichen flora of several Scottish islands and mountains. He collaborated with Brian John Coppins, Alan Fryday and Vince Giavarini. Gilbert wrote a book about the efforts to find lichens in the British Isles.

He also studied the urban ecology of Sheffield, identifying that many fig trees grew on the banks of the river Don as it passed through Sheffield, supported by the warm microclimate caused by industrial cooling water. He undertook research into ways to repair urban brownfield land to become a biodiverse habitat and was co-author of the book Habitat Creation and Repair that was considered important for its philosophy and ethics as well as practical information.

== Awards and honours ==
He was president of the British Lichen Society from 1976 until 1978 and editor of its bi-annual bulletin from 1980 until 1989. In 1997, he was made an honorary member of the society and in 2004 was awarded its Ursula Duncan Award in recognition of his outstanding contribution to the study of lichens in Britain. The Caledonian lichen Catillaria gilbertii was named in his honour by colleagues Alan Fryday and Brian John Coppins in 1996. They noted that the naming of this species, which produces twice the usual number of ascospores in its asci, was "particularly appropriate given the pre-disposition of the Gilbert family for producing twice the usual number of offspring at a time; Dr Gilbert himself is a twin and he also has twin daughters". However, inheritance of a tendency to have non-identical twins is a maternal characteristic; there is no inheritance of a tendency to have identical twins.

== Personal life ==
He married Daphne Broughton in 1969 and they had three children together, before the marriage was dissolved.

== Publications ==
Gilbert was the author or co-author of over 150 scientific publications and several books. These included:

Papers and book chapters

- Gilbert, O. L. (2000) Aquatic lichens. In: Lichen Atlas of the British Isles. Fascicle 5. Aquatic Lichens and Cladonia (Part 2) (M. R. D. Seaward, ed.) London, British Lichen Society.
- Gilbert, O. L. (1996) Retaining trees on construction sites. Arboricultural Journal 20 39–45.
- Gilbert, O. L., Fryday, A. J., Giavarini, V. J. & Coppins, B. J. (1992) The lichen vegetation of the Ben Nevis range. The Lichenologist 24 43–56.
- Gilbert, O. L., Fox, B. W. & Purvis, O. W. (1982) The lichen flora of a high-level limestone-epidiorite outcrop in the Ben Alder Range, Scotland. The Lichenologist 14 165–174.
- Wathern, P. & Gilbert, O. L. (1979) The production of grassland on subsoil. The Journal of Environmental Management 8 269–275.
- Gilbert, O. L., Earland-Bennett, P. & Coppins, B. J.(1978) Lichens of the sugar limestone refugium in Upper Teesdale. New Phytologist 80 403–408
- Gilbert, O. L. (1975) Effects of air pollution on landscape and land use around Norwegian aluminium smelters. Environmental Pollution 8 113–121.
- Gilbert, O. L. (1974) Lichens and air pollution. In: The Lichens (V. Ahmadjian & M. E. Hale, eds): 443–472. New York and London: Academic Press.
- Gilbert, O. L. (1970) A biological scale for the estimation of sulphur dioxide pollution. New Phytologist 69 629–634.
- Gilbert, O. L. (1968) Bryophytes as indicators of air pollution in the Tyne Valley. New Phytologist 67 15–30

Books

- The Lichen Hunters (2004)
- Lichens (2000) in the Collins New Naturalist series number 86
- Habitat Creation and Repair (1998) co-authored with Penny Anderson
- The Ecology of Urban Habitats (1989)
- A Lichen Flora of Northumberland (1988)

== Legacy ==
The lichen specimens collected by Gilbert as he developed A Lichen Flora of Northumberland are now in the herbarium of the Great North Museum: Hancock in Newcastle upon Tyne.

== See also ==
- Category:Taxa named by Oliver Gilbert (lichenologist)
