= Sowter =

Sowter is a surname. Notable people with the surname include:

- Francis Sowter (1852–1928), British Archdeacon
- Frederick Archibald Sowter (1899–1972), British naturalist
- Nathan Sowter (born 1992), Australian-born English cricketer
- Unwin Sowter (1839–1910), English cricketer

== See also ==
- Powter
- Souter
