= Simkin =

Simkin is a surname. As a surname in Slavic countries it's used for males, while the feminine counterpart is Simkina. Notable people with the surname include:

Surname

- Daniil Simkin (born 1987), Russian and American ballet dancer
- Darren Simkin (born 1970), English football player
- Janet Simkin, British plant ecologist and lichenologist
- Jim Simkin (1919–1984), Canadian-American psychotherapist
- John Simkin (1883–1967) Anglican Bishop in New Zealand
- J. L. Simkin (1833–1905) British biochemist
- Lily Simkin (born 2003), British footballer
- Penny Simkin (1938-2024), American physical therapist
- Richard Simkin (1850–1926), British artist and illustrator of military uniforms
- Toby Simkin (born 1964), theatrical producer
- Tommy Simkin (born 2004), British footballer
- William E. Simkin (1907–1992), American labor mediator and private arbitrator

== See also ==
- Simkin de Pio (born 1976), Filipino painter
