= Brian John Coppins =

British botanist and lichenologist

Brian J. Coppins
- Born: 1949 (age 76–77); Pembury, Kent, UK
- Education: University of Hull; King's College London University College London; Tunbridge Wells Grammar School for Boys
- Awards: Acharius Medal (2010); Linnean Medal (2011)
- Scientific career
- Fields: Lichenology
- Workplaces: Royal Botanic Garden Edinburgh
- Thesis: A taxonomic study of the lichen genus Micarea in Europe (1982)
- Author abbrev. (botany): Coppins

Brian John Coppins (born 1949) is a botanist and lichenologist, considered a world authority on crustose lichens and a leading expert on the genus Micarea.

== Education ==
Coppins' interest in lichens was sparked during a field trip to the Scottish island of Handa while studying at Tunbridge Wells Technical School for Boys. His early enthusiasm for lichens was notable; as a sixth-former, he and two friends, including Allan Pentecost, organised their own lichen expedition to Ireland, travelling by public transport and using The Observer's Book of Lichens for identification. Upon their return, they visited the British Museum, London to seek expert help with identifying their specimens. While still an undergraduate at the University of Hull, Coppins was the co-author, with D. W. Shimwell, of an important study of lichen dynamics in managed heathland. After receiving his B.Sc. in 1970, Coppins became a graduate student at King's College London and studied lichen ecophysiology under the supervision of Francis Rose but he changed the focus of his doctoral studies to the taxonomy of Micarea species found in Europe.

== Career ==
In 1974 was appointed as an ascomycete taxonomist in the herbarium of the Royal Botanic Garden Edinburgh (RBGE). He spent his career there, retiring in May 2009. He received his Ph.D. in 1982 from University College London. His dissertation, supervised jointly by Francis Rose and Peter Wilfred James, was published in 1983. The work was based upon examination of about 3500 lichen collections and involved field work not only in the British Isles but also in Denmark and Sweden.

Prior to his appointment at Edinburgh, Coppins made contributions to regional lichen research, particularly to the Northumberland lichen flora. He was known for his ability to find small, previously overlooked species by carefully examining tree roots and peeling back grass from around boulders. During field surveys, he demonstrated an ability to identify most lichens without laboratory examination. His expertise was such that other lichenologists would gather for informal field meetings when he visited an area, benefiting from his knowledge.

His field research has been mostly in Scotland but he has also collected lichens in "Borneo, Chile, the Carpathians, Thailand, USA, Norway and Canada". He has contributed about 25,000 preserved specimens to the RBGE's herbarium. His co-collectors include Ursula Katherine Duncan, David John Galloway, Peter W. James, and Francis Rose. He also collaborated with in field studies on lichen distributions with Oliver Gilbert, Alan Fryday and Vince Giavarini.

Following the retirements of Peter James and Jack Laundon from the British Museum (Natural History) in the late 1980s, Coppins emerged as a central figure in British lichenology. Since his PhD on the genus Micarea was published in 1983, he had gradually acquired an international reputation as an expert on small and difficult lichens, with fieldworkers coining the phrase "a Coppins species" for particularly small or taxonomically challenging specimens. He became the primary taxonomic authority consulted by lichenologists throughout Britain, with specimens from around the world sent to him for identification. His speed and accuracy at identifying lichens under the microscope became legendary among colleagues.

Brian Coppins and his wife Alexandra "Sandy" M. Coppins have worked together for decades, making thousands of lichen surveys. After they became partners, they developed a consultancy team willing to survey sites throughout the British Isles. Their complementary skills—Brian focusing on identification work and Sandy handling field notes and report production—made them particularly effective. By the end of 2000, they had produced about 150 reports, many exceeding a hundred pages. Recognising the risk of unpublished surveys becoming lost, they maintained a catalogue of consultancy reports on the British Lichen Society website, termed the 'Grey Literature'. They have also worked to increase awareness of the importance of lichen communities and to conserve "habitats such as the Atlantic hazel woods, Scottish native pinewoods, and alpine areas such as Ben Lawers and the Ben Nevis range". In 2009 they received The Plantlife Award for Contributions to the Conservation of Plant Diversity. In 2016 Brian and Sandy Coppins were jointly awarded the Lifetime Achievement Award of the Royal Society for the Protection of Birds (RSPB) Scotland and, in addition, the Bob Saville Award from the Wildlife Information Centre in Bo'ness.

By the early 2000s, the centre of British lichenology had effectively shifted from London to Scotland, specifically to the Royal Botanic Garden Edinburgh and to the Coppins' house in East Linton, where many lichenologists would gather for discussions about identification and taxonomy. Despite his growing responsibilities and international reputation, Coppins continued to dedicate time to fieldwork, spending more time in the field later in his career than he had previously.

== Awards and honours ==
Brian Coppins was the president of the British Lichen Society from 1988 to 1989. He was Senior Editor of the RBGE's Edinburgh Journal of Botany from 1984 to 2001 and continues to serve on the editorial boards of The Lichenologist (since 1983) and the Turkish Journal of Botany (since 2001).

He was honoured in the naming of the fungal genera Coppinsia, Briancoppinsia, Brianiopsis, and Snippocia, and the lichen species Dictyonema coppinsii.

== Selected publications ==
- Hawksworth, D. L.; James, P. W.; Coppins, B. J. (1980). "Checklist of British Lichen-Forming, Lichenicolous and Allied Fungi". The Lichenologist. 12: 1–115. doi:10.1017/S0024282980000035. 1980
- Boonpragob, K.; Homchantara, N.; Coppins, B.J.; McCarthy, P.M.; Wolseley, P.A. (1998). "An introduction to the lichen flora of Khao Yai National Park, Thailand". Botanical Journal of Scotland. 50 (2): 209–219. doi:10.1080/03746609808684918. 1998
- Coppins, A. M.; Coppins, B. J. (2002). Indices of ecological continuity for woodland epiphytic lichen habitats in the British Isles (PDF). London: British Lichen Society.
- Stofer, Silvia; Bergamini, Ariel; Aragón, Gregorio; Carvalho, Palmira; Coppins, Brian J.; Davey, Simon; Dietrich, Michael; Farkas, Edit; Kärkkäinen, Kati; Keller, Christine; Lökös, László; Lommi, Sampsa; Máguas, Cristina; Mitchell, Ruth; Pinho, Pedro; Rico, Víctor J.; Truscott, Anne-Marie; Wolseley, Patricia A.; Watt, Allan; Scheidegger, Christoph (2006). "Species richness of lichen functional groups in relation to land use intensity". The Lichenologist. 38 (4): 331–353. doi:10.1017/S0024282906006207. S2CID 86057118. 2006
- Ellis, Christopher J.; Coppins, Brian J. (2007). "19th century woodland structure controls stand-scale epiphyte diversity in present-day Scotland". Diversity and Distributions. 13: 84–91. doi:10.1111/j.1366-9516.2006.00310.x. 2007
- Homchantara, N.; Coppins, B. J. (2002). "New Species of the Lichen Family Thelotremataceae in SE Asia". The Lichenologist. 34 (2): 113–140. doi:10.1006/lich.2002.0382. S2CID 85429979. 2007
- Ellis, Christopher J.; Coppins, Brian J. (2007). "Reproductive strategy and the compositional dynamics of crustose lichen communities on aspen (Populus tremula L.) in Scotland". The Lichenologist. 39 (4): 377–391. doi:10.1017/S0024282907006937. S2CID 86143004. 2007
- Brand, M.; Coppins, B. J.; van den Boom, P. P.; Sérusiaux, E. (2009). "Further data on the lichen genus Basidia s.l. in the Canary Islands and Western Europe, with descriptions of two new species" (PDF). Bibliotheca Lichenologica. 99: 81–92.
- Ellis, Christopher J.; Coppins, Brian J. (2010). "Integrating multiple landscape-scale drivers in the lichen epiphyte response: Climatic setting, pollution regime and woodland spatial-temporal structure". Diversity and Distributions. 16: 43–52. doi:10.1111/j.1472-4642.2009.00624.x. S2CID 83698609. 2010
- Kelly, Laura J.; Hollingsworth, Peter M.; Coppins, Brian J.; Ellis, Christopher J.; Harrold, Paul; Tosh, James; Yahr, Rebecca (2011). "DNA barcoding of lichenized fungi demonstrates high identification success in a floristic context". New Phytologist. 191 (1): 288–300. doi:10.1111/j.1469-8137.2011.03677.x. PMID 21434928. 2011
- Ellis, Christopher J.; Eaton, Sally; Theodoropoulos, Marios; Coppins, Brian J.; Seaward, Mark R.D.; Simkin, Janet (2014). "Response of epiphytic lichens to 21st Century climate change and tree disease scenarios". Biological Conservation. 180: 153–164. doi:10.1016/j.biocon.2014.09.046. 2014

== See also ==
- Category:Taxa named by Brian John Coppins
