= Tunbridge Grammar School =

Tunbridge Grammar School may refer, at different periods, to:

- Tonbridge School
- Tonbridge Grammar School
- Tunbridge Wells Grammar School for Boys
- Tunbridge Wells Girls' Grammar School
