= Brian Fox =

Brian Fox may refer to:

- Brian Fox (programmer) (born 1959), computer programmer, author, and free software advocate
- Brian Fox (artist), portrait painter
- Brian James Fox, drummer known for his work with White Tiger and as a member of Silent Rage
- Brian Fox (Gaelic footballer) (born 1988), Irish Gaelic football player
- Brian William Fox (1929–1999), professor of experimental chemotherapy and lichenologist
