= Frederick Archibald Sowter =

British naturalist (1899–1972)

- Born: 30 August 1899; Leicester, England
- Died: 16 November 1972 (aged 73)
- Education: University of Nottingham
- Scientific career
- Fields: Botany, bryology, lichenology
- Workplaces: Courtaulds
- Author abbrev. (botany): Sowter

Frederick Archibald Sowter (30 August 1899 – 16 November 1972) was a British botanist, bryologist, and lichenologist. He made contributions to the study of cryptogams, particularly in Leicestershire and Rutland.

== Early life and education ==
Born in Leicester, Sowter attended Wyggeston Grammar School for Boys from 1909 to 1914. After leaving school, he worked for two years at a textile firm in Leicester, preparing for a business career. During World War I, he joined a Cadet Battalion, spending time at Bulwell Hall, Nottingham, and Keble College, Oxford, before serving with the Argyll and Sutherland Highlanders in France during the latter part of the war. He was commissioned as a second lieutenant in November 1918 and served for an additional year in Germany after the war.

== Career ==
Following his military service, Sowter studied textile chemistry at the University of Nottingham. He then joined Courtaulds, where he spent most of his professional life, retiring as assistant sales manager of their Leicester office in 1958. Despite his career in textiles, Sowter's passion for natural history, nurtured from an early age by Arthur Reginald Horwood, sub-curator at Leicester City Museum, shaped his contributions to botany.

== Botanical contributions ==
=== Early work and "Horwood's Boys" ===
Sowter was part of a group known as "Horwood's Boys", young men who accompanied Horwood on field excursions in Leicestershire. This early experience contributed to his later work in compiling data for Horwood and Gainsborough's Flora of Leicestershire and Rutland (1933), for which he collected and listed flowering plants throughout these counties. In September 1933, during the British Association's visit to Leicester, Sowter led a botanical excursion, demonstrating his growing expertise in the field.

=== Bryology ===
Sowter's interest in bryophytes intensified in the 1930s, culminating in his 1941 publication on the bryophytes of Leicestershire and Rutland. He served as editor of the Transactions of the British Bryological Society from 1947 to 1955 and was elected president of the society in 1958.

=== Lichenology ===
In the 1940s, Sowter turned his attention to lichens, at a time when British lichenology was at its lowest ebb. His comprehensive account of Leicestershire and Rutland lichens, published in 1950, was the first detailed work on county lichens since Walter Watson's 1930 treatment of Somerset. In 1953, Sowter organised a lichen study group that exchanged named specimens, with the goal of promoting the study of lichens in Britain; it soon included members who would later become prominent in British lichenology, including Jack Laundon and Peter Wilfred James.

Sowter's contributions to lichenology extended beyond his local area. He traveled widely across Britain in the 1940s and early 1950s, building up his collections and knowledge of British lichens. In 1945, he prepared an account of some of his Cumberland and Westmorland collections. He also contributed data to various publications, including the Census Catalogue of British Lichens (1953), the Collins New Naturalist volume on The Peak District (1962), and Rimington's section on lichens in The Natural History of the Scarborough District (1953).

=== Flowering plants and slime moulds ===
Sowter's botanical interests were diverse. His work on Arum maculatum in the Journal of Ecology in 1949 was one of the first accounts in the Biological Flora series. His interest in slime moulds was encouraged by the mycologist Cecil Terence Ingold, who proposed he document the local Myxomycetes. In 1958, he published an account of the Myxomycetes of Leicestershire and Rutland. Sowter's 1960 paper "Our diminishing flora" drew attention to the disappearance of interesting and rare species in the region.

== Later life and legacy ==
Despite suffering from a bronchial condition in his later years, Sowter continued his botanical work until shortly before his death. His herbarium, containing approximately 3,500 lichen and 1,500 bryophyte specimens, along with his notebooks and other documents, was bequeathed to Leicester City Museum. His extensive cryptogamic library was divided between the British Bryological Society and the British Lichen Society.

In his younger days, Sowter played tennis for Leicestershire and was also interested in philately, serving as President of the Leicester Philatelic Society in 1937. He served on the Council of the Leicester Literary and Philosophical Society from 1933 until his death and was on the Museums, Libraries and Publicity Committee of Leicester City Council from July 1952.

Sowter's enthusiasm and willingness to assist others made him a key figure in British lichenology during the first half of the 20th century. His work provided valuable records during a period when little lichen recording was carried out in Britain.

== Personal life ==
Sowter was married twice. His first wife was named Muriel, and his second wife was Marion G. Sowter (née Lewis).

== Honours and affiliations ==
- Fellow of the Linnean Society of London (elected 1944)
- Honorary member of the British Lichen Society (elected 1971)
- President of the Natural History Section of the Leicester Literary and Philosophical Society (1964 onwards)
- Member of the British Mycological Society and the British Ecological Society

== Selected publications ==
- Sowter, F.A. (1941). The cryptogamic flora of Leicestershire and Rutland, Bryophytes. Leicester: F.A. Sowter.
- Sowter, F.A. (1950). The cryptogamic flora of Leicestershire and Rutland, Lichenes. Leicester: Leicester Literary and Philosophical Society.
- Sowter, F.A. (1958). "The Mycetozoa of Leicestershire and Rutland". Leicester Literary and Philosophical Society Transactions. 52: 21–27.
- Sowter, F.A. (1969). "Leicestershire and Rutland bryophytes 1945–1969". Leicester Literary and Philosophical Society Transactions. 63: 40–49.
