= Ruth Gilbert =

Ruth Gilbert may refer to:

- Ruth Gilbert, English children's author who wrote under her maiden name, Ruth Ainsworth
- Ruth Gilbert (poet) (1917–2016), New Zealand poet
- Ruth Gilbert (actress) (1912–1993), American actress
