= Brightman =

Brightman may refer to:

- Al Brightman (1923–1992), American basketball player and coach
- Alex Brightman (born 1987), American stage actor
- Amelia Brightman (born 1979), English singer and songwriter
- Edgar S. Brightman (1884–1953), philosopher and Christian theologian
- Frank Edward Brightman (1856–1932), English scholar
- Frank Hatton Brightman (1921–1996), British lichenologist
- Jerry Brightman (1953–2015), steel guitarist
- John Brightman, Baron Brightman (1911–2006), English judge
- Robert A. Brightman, American anthropologist
- Sarah Brightman (born 1960), English classical crossover soprano, actress and dancer
- Thomas Brightman (1562–1607), English clergyman and biblical commentator

== Other ==
- Bright Man is a Robot Master in the Mega Man series
- Brightman Street Bridge, a bridge in Fall River/Somerset, Massachusetts
