= Jack Laundon =

British lichenologist and mycologist

- Born: Jack Rodney Laundon; July 28, 1934; Kettering, UK
- Died: 31 December 2016 (aged 82)
- Known for: Lichen ecology, lichen taxonomy
- Spouse: Rita June Bransby
- Awards: Ursula Duncan Award of British Lichen Society
- Scientific career
- Fields: Lichenology
- Author abbrev. (botany): Laundon

Jack Rodney Laundon (28 July 1934 – 31 December 2016) was a British lichenologist and became president of the British Lichen Society.

== Education and personal life ==
Jack Rodney Laundon was born 28 July 1934 in Kettering, Northamptonshire. He was educated at Park Road School, Kettering Central School and Kettering Grammar School, and then worked at the British Museum (Natural History) from 1952–1990, mainly in the lichen section. He married Rita June Bransby in 1958 and they had one daughter. He died 31 December 2016.

== Career ==
He was interested in lichen from his teens, and developed his interests in lichen ecology and taxonomy as well as the specimen curation and identification required by his post. This included curating the collection of specimens from Erik Acharius held at the museum. Laundon was known for his research on the lichen flora of London, methodically relating species distributions to both current and historical levels of air pollution. He helped establish the use of chemotaxonomy for lichens at the museum and was active in verifying specimens sent to the museum. His application of the International Code of Botanical Nomenclature was sometimes controversial and led to changes in the code so that species names could be proposed for retention. His work in lichen nomenclature was so influential that colleagues coined the term "Jacked" to describe any well-known species that underwent a name change due to his research.

He published over 150 articles and several books during his career. These included a popular book Lichens (1986, 2001) illustrated with his own photographs. In 1956 he published a survey of the lichens of Northamptonshire, and was the first to apply the Scandinavian method of lichen communities to the UK. In 1960 his observation of Lecidea (now Placynthiella) oligotropha in Northamptonshire was published. His surveys of the lichens of London in the late 1960s were the first to map species distributions relative to atmospheric sulphur dioxide levels. His records from gravestones demonstrated that lichen communities were retained on old memorials but did not colonise new ones. He continued to record and publish about lichen distributions until 2012, showing that lichens returned once sulphur dioxide levels fell.

Laundon was a founder member of the British Lichen Society. He participated in the inaugural meeting at the British Museum on 1 February 1958 where the society was established. In 1955, he had already played a role in the development of lichenology in Britain by recommending Arthur Wade as a suitable leader for the first lichen field courses at Malham Tarn Field Studies Centre. He was president of the society in 1984–1985, having been editor of the British Lichen Society Bulletin from 1963 until 1979, and honorary secretary from 1964–1984. During his editorship, Laundon expanded the Bulletin from a single-page newsletter into a substantive publication featuring lead articles, photographs, and information about conservation, gradually increasing it to about twenty pages. He was elected as honorary member of the society in 1988, and received the Ursula Duncan Award in recognition of his services to the British Lichen Society in 2007.

He edited The London Naturalist from 1971 until 1979 and the Bulletin of the British Museum (Natural History), Botany Series from 1977 until 1990. He was a life member of the Museums Association, and was awarded a Fellowship of the Association in 1972.

He was required to retire in 1990 as part of restructuring at the museum as it moved away from taxonomy, but he continued to be very active with lichens and Northamptonshire local history, including authoring several publications, until mid-December 2016, shortly before his death.

== Legacy ==
Laundon was a foundational contributor to the journal The Lichenologist, publishing in its inaugural volume in 1958. During the British Lichen Society's formative years, he served as editor of the BLS Bulletin while his colleague Peter Wilfred James edited The Lichenologist. As a taxonomist at the Natural History Museum, Laundon specialised in challenging lichen groups that received less attention from other researchers, particularly focusing on sterile crustose lichens. His contributions to the journal and society helped establish both as important institutions in lichenology, supporting the field's development during a period when English-language resources on lichens were limited.

The lichen Lepraria jackii was named in his honour in 1992, and the lichen products jackinic acid and norjackinic acid were described in 1995 and named after him. Other eponyms include Phoma laundoniae, Camposporium laundonii, and Puccinia laundonii.

Laundon has been credited for introducing the term photomorph in a 1995 publication, in an attempt to clarify what he thought were inadequate terms available to describe the range of fungal-algal interactions in the lichen symbiosis.

Trees were planted in his memory by the Kettering and District Natural History Society at Twywell Hills and Dales in November 2019

=== At the Natural History Museum ===
At the British Museum (Natural History), Laundon was known as an approachable and helpful presence in the lichen section. Alongside Peter James, he created what many regarded as the spiritual home of British lichenology, where both professional and amateur lichenologists could receive assistance with specimen identification. Visitors to the museum would be welcomed and provided with desk space to consult collections or have their specimens examined. Laundon's friendly demeanour and willingness to help contributed significantly to the museum's reputation as a central hub for lichenological studies in Britain. He regularly participated in British Lichen Society field meetings, sometimes bringing his family.

== Selected publications ==
Some of Laundon's publications include:

- Laundon, J. R. (2010) Lecanora antiqua, a new saxicolous species from Great Britain, and the nomenclature and authorship of L. albescens, L. conferta and L. muralis. Lichenologist 42 6 631-636
- Laundon, J. R. (2008) Some synonyms in Chrysothrix and Lepraria. Lichenologist 40 5 411-414
- Laundon, J. R. (2005) The publication and typification of Sir James Edward Smith's lichens in English Botany. Botanical Journal of the Linnean Society 147 4 483-499
- Laundon, J. R. (2003) Six lichens of the Lecanora varia group. Nova Hedwiga 76 1-2 83-111
- Roos, M and Laundon, J. R. (1995) On the Classification of lichen photomorphs. Taxon 44 3 387-389
- Elix, J.A., Naidu, R. and Laundon, J. R. (1994) The structure and synthesis of 4-oxypannaric acid 2-methyl ester, a dibenzofuran from the lichen Leproloma diffusum. Australian Journal of Chemistry 47 4 703-714
- Laundon, J. R. (1992) Lepraria in the British Isles. Lichenologist 24 4 315-350
- Diamantopoulos, I., Pirintsos, S., Laundon, J.R. and Vokou, D. (1992) The epiphytic lichens around Thessaloniki (Greece) as indicators of sulfur dioxide pollution. Lichenologist 24 1 63-71
- Laundon, J. R. (1989) The species of Leproloma - the name for the Lepraria-Membranacea group. Lichenologist 21 1 1-22
- Laundon, J. R. (1984) The typification of Withering neglected lichens. Lichenologist 16 3 211-239
- Jones, D., Wilson, M.J. and Laundon, J. R. (1982) Observations on the location and form of lead in Stereocaulon vesuvianum. Lichenologist 14 3 281-286
- Laundon, J. R. (1981) The species of Chrysothrix. Lichenologist 13 2 101-121
- Laundon, J. R. (1979) Deceased lichenologists - their abbreviations and herbaria. Lichenologist 11 1 1-26
- Laundon, J. R. (1978) Haematomma chemotypes form fused thalli. Lichenologist 10 2 221-225
