= Narrows Center for the Arts =

Coordinates: 41°42′11.0124″N 71°9′46.2492″W

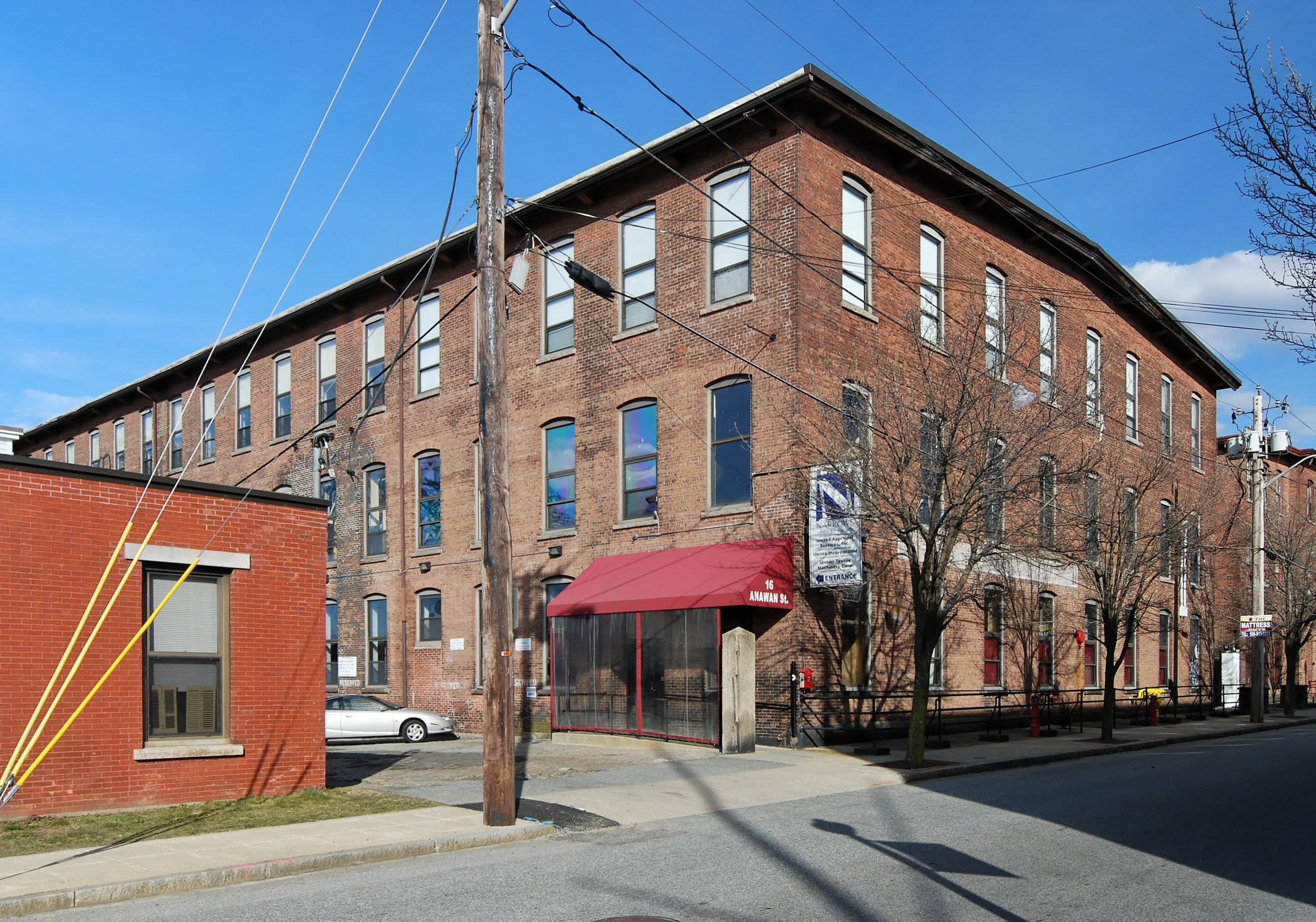
Narrows Center for the Arts, housed in former American Printing Company mill building (built 1906)

The Narrows Center for the Arts is a non-profit art and musical performance venue in Fall River, Massachusetts, USA. It was founded in 1995 for the promotion and enjoyment of the visual and performing arts. It comprises two visual art galleries, a performance theater, and visual artist studios.

== History and description ==
Supported by public donations, contributions from the Friends of the Narrows, and staffed solely by volunteers, the Narrows moved from its initial location in "the Narrows" section of Fall River, Massachusetts (hence the venue's name) to its current location on the third floor of the former American Printing Company mill building on Anawan Street overlooking the historic Battleship Cove complex on Mount Hope Bay.

The venue began as a side project at a small art gallery and is one of several groups that have made an effort, in cooperation with the Fall River Cultural Council and the Massachusetts Cultural Council, to increase awareness of the arts in the Fall River area, making use of vacant mill and warehouse spaces for studios and performance centers. A proposal is in place to revitalize the downtown area by the creation of an Arts District, and the venue was among a group of recipients of grants intended to increase awareness of local destinations and cultural events in the southeastern Massachusetts region. A music venue in an open, high-ceiling early 20th century mill with tables and donated church pews surrounds a small stage, providing the setting for everything from folk to blues to rock.

== Art ==
The Narrows brings to the city of Fall River an accessible variety of art created by local, regional, and national artisans.

=== Galleries ===
The venue contains two visual art galleries. Visitors enter through the Narrows' main Gallery, a space with an impressive 210 linear feet of exhibition walls in an elegant architectural design. Morphing several times throughout the year, the main Gallery presents artwork of every medium. The Narrows Café Gallery occupies a linear wall facing Battleship Cove at the opposite end of the venue. This space is ideal for sequential unfolding of a theme and single artist shows. Having two galleries affords visitors and artists multiple opportunities to view and exhibit fine art. The Narrows presents museum quality nationally touring exhibitions in addition to the artwork of student, local, national and international artists. "The Art of the Brick" by Nathan Sawaya, "Pulp Function", "Duende: The Art of Anthony Quinn", "Jerry Garcia Art Tour", "Petroleum Paradox: For Better or for Worse?" and "The Artwork of Richie Havens" are examples of extraordinary past touring exhibitions the Narrows has hosted. Brian Fox (photography), in addition to many local artists, is another of many artists to present in this space. The Narrows also often exhibits artwork from local public and private high school students and works created by students from the nearby University of Massachusetts-Dartmouth. Docent led tours and workshops for children are integral to visual arts programming at the Narrows. Since arts related activities are cost prohibitive to many, the Narrows provides free admission to the gallery during regular gallery hours. In doing so, the Narrows affords everyone a no-cost opportunity to view spectacular artwork. Concert-goers are also welcome to view the artwork on performance nights.

=== Art community ===
In addition to the art galleries, the Narrows provides studio space to several in-house local artists, ranging from painters and photographers to knitters and guitar-makers. Many of these studios are occupied during musical events. Local artwork is for sale - including jewelry, sculpture, paintings, photography, etc. The Art Community is located on the second floor of the building.

== Performing arts ==
The Narrows provides access to local, national, and international performing artists across several genres of music.

=== Music ===
The venue has hosted local, national and international musical acts, including Duke Robillard, Eric Lindell, David Lindley, Johnny Winter, Eilen Jewell, Peter Wolf, Blue Öyster Cult, Susan Tedeschi, and local performers such as Roomful of Blues.

=== Comedy ===
The Narrows occasionally hosts comedy events, with national acts such as Paula Poundstone as well as local comedians.

== Education ==
The Narrows Center offers educational opportunities to the public and to local school students including hands-on workshops and exhibit space.

== Awards and grants ==
The Narrows Center has been recognized by the following:

- Mass Cultural Council - Cultural Investment Funding (2014)
- Providence/Boston Phoenix - Best Folk Venue (2008, 2010, 2011, 2013)
- Rhode Island Monthly Magazine - Best Destination Concerts (2007)
