= Coslett Herbert Waddell =

Irish botanist (1858–1919)

Rev. Coslett Herbert Waddell
- Born: 6 March 1858; Drumcro, County Antrim
- Died: 8 June 1919 (aged 61); Greyabbey, County Down
- Education: Trinity College, Dublin
- Known for: Work on difficult genera of flowering plants
- Scientific career
- Fields: Priest (Church of Ireland), botanist
- Institutions: Saintfield, Greyabbey (both County Down)
- Author abbrev. (botany): Waddell

Coslett Herbert Waddell (Rev.) (March 6, 1858 at Drumcro, County Antrim – June 8, 1919) was an Irish priest (Church of Ireland) and botanist.

== Early life ==
He studied at Lurgan and Trinity College, Dublin: he got his B.A. in 1880 and his M.A. in 1888.

He followed his religious calling and was ordained as a deacon in 1881 and priest in 1882. He became vicar in Saintfield in 1890 and rector of Greyabbey in 1912. While being a priest in several consecutive parishes, he continued his studies and became Bachelor of Divinity in 1892.

== Botany career ==
He showed an early interest in botany, in which he was aided by S.A. Stewart. From 1893 onwards he was a contributor to the Journal of Botany and a frequent contributor to the Irish Naturalist.

He was the author of many botanical papers. He is known for work on difficult genera of flowering plants, such as brambles, roses, hawkweeds and knotweeds where asexual reproduction dominates leading to many microspecies. He was the first to record the rare Seaside Centaury (Centaurium littorale) in Ireland in 1913. The standard author abbreviation Waddell is used to indicate this person as the author when citing a botanical name.

He was especially interested and specialised in bryophytes, especially liverworts and proposed the establishment of the Moss Exchange Club in 1896. This members club for exchange of specimens and information later developed into the British Bryological Society. He was the first secretary of the Moss Exchange Club and served for seven years.

A large collection of his specimens is in the Ulster Museum Herbarium in Belfast, having been donated in 1919 to the Queen's University of Belfast after his death by his widow. He took a warm interest in the Belfast Naturalists' Field Club and served on the Committee.

He died at Greyabbey, and was buried at Maralin; at the time of his death, he was chaplain to the Marquis of Londonderry.

== Family ==
On 19 August 1891 he married Eleanor Monsarrat, daughter of a vicar; they had no children, but adopted two nieces.

He was related, via his mother Maria Langtry, to Lillie Langtry, the "Jersey Lily".

== Publications ==
- Waddell, C.H. 1905. Glyceria festucaeformis at Portaferry. Irish Naturalists 14: 19.
- Waddell, C.H. 1912. Some County Down plants. Irish Naturalists 21: 133-134.
- Waddell, C.H. 1917. Rare plants of the Co. Down coast. Irish Naturalists 26: 12-13.
