= Peter Lambley =

Conservationist & lichenologist (1946–2022)

Peter Lambley MBE
- Born: November 4, 1946; Birmingham
- Died: January 27, 2022 (aged 75)
- Education: University of Leicester
- Spouse: Gill
- Scientific career
- Author abbrev. (botany): Lambley

Peter Lambley MBE was a naturalist, lichenologist and conservation manager. He was president of the British Lichen Society 2008–2010.

== Personal life ==
Peter William Lambley was born in Birmingham, with his family moving to Ifield, West Sussex, later in his childhood. He had a broad interest in natural history and the opportunity to spend time in the countryside. He took a B.Sc. degree in botany at University of Leicester. He married in 1970.

== Career ==
Lambley was first employed by Norfolk Museums Service for 15 years, becoming head of Natural History at Norwich Castle Museum, before moving with his family to work as a senior technical officer at the University of Papua New Guinea. He supervised the university's herbarium and led field visits.

He returned to the UK to live near Dereham. From 1989 until 2006 he worked as a conservation officer for English Nature in Norfolk to manage several coastal sites. In addition, he was the organisation's lichen specialist. He wrote two volumes about the lichens of Norfolk published by the Norfolk and Norwich Naturalists Society in 1988 and 1989. He also contributed to reports about the county's birds in addition to specialist reports in his role as a conservation officer.

== Honours ==
In 2007 Lambley was made MBE for his conservation work, particularly on the north Norfolk coast. He was involved with the British Lichen Society as treasurer and county recorder for many years and was the society's president from 2008 until 2010.

The lichen Parmotrema lambley found on a tree in Papua New Guinea and the trap-door spider Nihoa lambley are named after him.
