= Steve Ormerod =

English academic

Stephen J. Ormerod is a professor of ecology and former Chair of the Council of the Royal Society for the Protection of Birds (RSPB), Europe's largest wildlife conservation charity.

== Biography ==
Ormerod grew up in Burnley, East Lancashire, England.

He was educated at Burnley Grammar School, Huddersfield University and subsequently at Cardiff University, where he obtained a PhD in river ecology in 1985. He is father to four children, with three stepsons and one biological son.

== Career ==
Ormerod was appointed Professor of Ecology in the Cardiff School of Biosciences at Cardiff University in 2001, and chair of the RSPB Council at their AGM in 2012.

The Royal Society for the Protection of Birds is Europe's largest wildlife conservation charity. Ormerod was previously chair of the RSPB's Advisory Committee for Wales and is a former president of the Institute of Ecology and Environmental Management. and has been a member of the councils of the Freshwater Biological Association, the Countryside Council for Wales, the Rivers' Trust and the British Trust for Ornithology.

He was chief editor of the Journal of Applied Ecology. He sat on the scientific advisory committee of the Wildfowl and Wetlands Trust and was on the expert panel of Department for Environment, Food and Rural Affairs (DEFRA)'s National Ecosystem Assessment and was a member of other DEFRA committees. In 1987 he was a fellow of the Winston Churchill Memorial Trust when he looked at the problems associated with acid rain. This has been a continuing interest in his research which has been supported by the European Union and the Natural Environment Research Council.

In 2011 he received the Zoological Society of London's Marsh Award for Marine and Freshwater Conservation. He was elected a Fellow of the Learned Society of Wales (FLSW) and a Fellow of the Society of Biology (FSB), in 2013. In his academic career Ormerod has published more than 200 scientific papers.

In 2026 Ormerod was elected a Fellow of the British Ecological Society.
