= Frank Hatton Brightman =

British lichenologist

- Born: May 15, 1921; Leyton, Essex, England
- Died: June 20, 1996 (aged 75)
- Education: University College, London
- Spouse: 2
- Children: 2
- Scientific career
- Workplaces: County Grammar School for Boys, Beckenham and Penge; Natural History Museum, London

Frank Hatton Brightman (1921 - 1996) was a natural historian, specialising in lichenology. He popularised lichenology in the UK from the late 1950s onwards. He also had important organisational roles at several natural history societies.

== Early life ==
Brightman was born in Leyton in Essex on 15 May 1921. After attending the County School for Boys in Leyton, he enrolled at University College London to study botany. This was in autumn 1939 while the students and staff had been evacuated to the premises of University College North Wales in Bangor because of the Second World War. He graduated with B.Sc. degree in 1942.

== Career ==
He was conscripted into the Royal Electrical and Mechanical Engineers to work on radar development but ill-health meant he had to leave. He gained employment as a science teacher at the South East London Emergency Secondary School until the end of the war. He then moved to the County Grammar School for Boys, Beckenham and Penge where he remained for 25 year. He was promoted to head of science.

From 1971 until retiring in 1981 he was employed as the head of the Education Section of the Natural History Museum, London. Among other roles, he produced information leaflets, including one on the Conservation of Wild Creatures and Wild Plants Act 1975, the first legislation to protect wild plants in the UK. He then worked, in a voluntary capacity, to benefit the South London Botanical Institute as its honorary director until 1996 and, in collaboration with his wife, to restore its garden. He was also involved as a committee member, journal editor or organiser of field visits with several scientific and natural history societies. These included the Botanical Society of Britain and Ireland, Kent Field Club and British Bryological Society. He was president of the Kent Field Club 1992 - 1994 and an honorary warden of Downe Bank nature reserve. Brightman was a fellow of the Linnean Society of London, awarded Fellow honoris causa in 1995. He edited the Natural History Book Reviews journal from 1977 until it closed in 1990. He collected plant specimens for his own personal herbarium and some were later were placed in national herbaria.

== Lichenology ==
Brightman's most significant work was his study of lichens. He was enthusiastic about identifying and recording them. His chapter 'Neglected plants - lichens' in 1959 in the popular Penguin book series New Biology was influential since it was one of the earliest accounts about lichens aimed at a general audience. He was one of the founding members of the British Lichen Society and immediately started to organise one of the new society's study groups and many field meetings. He continued to support the society until the 1990s in many organisational and scientific roles. Brightman was the society's president from 1978 until 1980. He was made an Honorary member of the society in 1988.

== Publications ==
Brightman was the author or co-author of several books as well as over 20 scientific papers and popular articles. These included:

- Brightman, F. H. (1984) Vegetable dyeing for amateurs: a selected bibliography. Natural History Book Reviews volume 7 pp 117–121.
- Brightman, F. H. & Seaward, M. R. D. (1977) Lichens of man-made substrates. In: Lichen Ecology (M. R. D. Seaward ed.): 253–293. London: Academic Press.
- Albertus, Frank Hatton Brightman and Michael R. Best (1973) The book of secrets of Albertus Magnus : of the virtues of herbs, stones and certain beasts : also A book of marvels of the world, Clarendon Press, Oxford pp178 ISBN 978-0877289418
- Frank H. Brightman and Barbara E. Nicholson (1966) Oxford Book of Flowerless Plants Oxford University Press, 232pp ISBN 978-0199100040.
- Brightman, F. H. (1964) The distribution of the lichen Lecanora conizaeoides Cromb. in north Ireland. Irish Naturalists' Journal volume 14 pp 258–262.
- Brightman, F. H. (1959) Neglected plants-lichens. New Biology volume 29 pp 75–94.

== Personal life ==
Brightman was married twice, and had two children with his first wife.
