= Christopher Gallard Gilbert =

British furniture historian

Christopher Gallard Gilbert (7 September 1936 – 29 September 1998) was a British furniture historian and museum curator. He wrote on Thomas Chippendale and was a founding member of the Furniture History Society in 1964. From 1975 to 1983, he was the editor of the society's annual journal, Furniture History, and, in 1990, he became its chairman.

Gilbert was born in Lancaster on 7 September 1936, the son of Frank Lathe Gilbert and the author Ruth Ainsworth and twin of Oliver Lathe Gilbert, the urban ecologist and lichenologist. He was twice married (two daughters; three stepsons, one stepdaughter). He died in Leeds on 29 September 1998.

== Bibliography ==
- The Life and Work of Thomas Chippendale (1978) 2 vols
