= Eleanora Armitage =

British botanist and writer

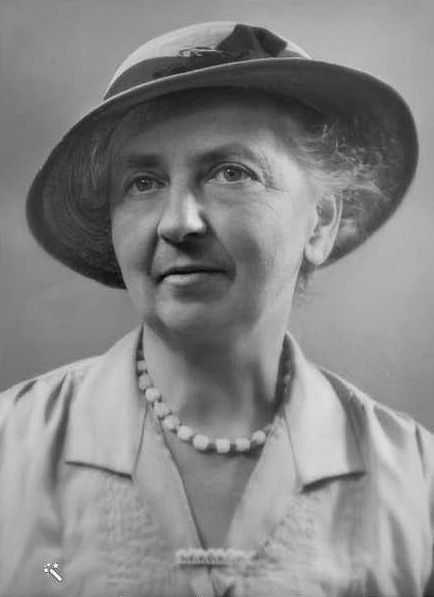
- in 1935
- Born: Eleanora Armitage; December 11, 1865; Bridstow
- Died: 24 October 1961 (aged 95); Bridstow
- Citizenship: United Kingdom
- Known for: founding member and President of the British Bryological Society
- Scientific career
- Fields: bryology
- Author abbrev. (botany): E.Arm.

Eleanora Armitage (December 11, 1865 - October 24, 1961) was a British bryologist who was a founding member of the Moss Exchange Club, the British Ecological Society and the British Bryological Society and served as president of the later organisation in 1939. She was an accomplished collector and her herbarium is now held at Bristol Museum. She was also a member of the British Association for the Advancement of Science as well as the Royal Horticultural Society.

== Early life ==
Armitage was born on 11 December 1865 at Dadnor House in Bridstow to Isabel Jane Armitage (née Perceval) and her husband Arthur. Armitage was educated at home. Her father was a member of the Woolhope Naturalists’ Field Club and her mother painted watercolours, some of which are held in the club's library. Despite her father having served as president of the Woolhope Club, Armitage was unable to join, as club banned the admission of women.

== Botanising ==
In 1896 Armitage became a founding member of the Moss Exchange Club. The Moss Exchange Club would later become the British Bryological Society. Armitage was also a member of the Botanical Essay Society. Armitage botanised frequently in Herefordshire and would sometimes be accompanied by Charles Herbert Binstead. She specialised in bryophytes and the genus Iris. She travelled frequently, including to Madeira, Grand Canary, Tenerife, Spain, Azores, Norway and Switzerland, and often collected specimens on her trips. She was also a botanical artist and Kew holds a collection of her paintings.

== Death ==
She died on the 24 October 1961 after a fall.

== Bibliography ==
The standard author abbreviation E.Arm. is used to indicate this person as the author when citing a botanical name.

- Eleonora Armitage (1944), A Short account of the Moss Exchange Club and the British Bryological Society (PDF), Wikidata Q108624860
- ELEONORA ARMITAGE (October 1926). "Sterility in the Vegetable Marrow". Nature. 118 (2973): 592–592. doi:10.1038/118592D0. ISSN 1476-4687. Wikidata Q60255157.
- Eleonora Armitage (1921). "Some observations on Arum maculatum L." (PDF). The Lancashire & Cheshire naturalist. 13 (7): 121–124. Wikidata Q108624781.
- ELEONORA ARMITAGE (August 1917). "An Invasion of Ants". Nature. 99 (2496): 525–526. doi:10.1038/099525C0. ISSN 1476-4687. Wikidata Q64305027.
- ELEONORA ARMITAGE (September 1915). "Nodules on the Intermediate Bladderwort". Nature. 96 (2396): 114–114. doi:10.1038/096114E0. ISSN 1476-4687. Wikidata Q64297428.
- ELEONORA ARMITAGE (January 1913). "Precocity of Spring Flowers". Nature. 90 (2255): 543–543. doi:10.1038/090543A0. ISSN 1476-4687. Wikidata Q64329394.
