= Penny Anderson =

British ecologist

- Education: University of London
- Scientific career
- Fields: ecologist

Penny Anderson is a British ecologist and founder of the consultancy Penny Anderson Associates. She was based in the Peak District National Park but worked in many other parts of the British Isles. She has been president of the Chartered Institute of Ecology and Environmental Management (2010–2012).

== Early life and education ==
Anderson was born and brought up in Kent. She studied a BSc degree in Botany and Geography at Southampton University and followed this with an MSc in Conservation from University College, London.

== Career ==
She moved with her family to northern England, settling in the Peak District in 1972. She provided ecological advice to the National Park Authority in the 1980s. Her work developed as an ecology consultant and became Penny Anderson Associates, based in Buxton. She formally retired in 2013. Her expertise was founded within the Peak District, especially about moorland and peatland restoration. However, she has also consulted on habitats and species in many other areas of the British Isles. Anderson has also given courses and lectures about habitat creation, restoration and management. She has volunteered in biological recording and monitoring for decades.

For 21 years Anderson was chair of the Peak Park Wildlife Advisory Group of volunteer nature conservation organisations that had an interest in the Peak District National Park. She was president of the Chartered Institute of Ecology and Environmental Management from 2010 until 2012. She was a member of the National Park Authority from 2015 to 2019.

== Publications ==
Anderson is the author or co-author of many reports, scientific publications and books. These include:

- Peak District, The New Naturalists no 144 (HarperCollins, 2021)
- The State of Nature in the Peak District for Nature Peak District (2016)
- Habitat Creation and Repair (Oxford University Press, 1998), co-authored with Oliver Gilbert
- Wild Flowers and Other Plants of the Peak District (1981) co-authored with Dave Shimwell
