= South London Botanical Institute =

UK organization formed to support the study of plants

Coordinates: 51.44345°N 0.10470°W

- Abbreviation: SLBI
- Established: 1910; 116 years ago
- Founder: Allan Octavian Hume
- Founded at: Tulse Hill
- Type: Charity
- Registration no.: 214251
- Purpose: Botanical education
- Headquarters: 323 Norwood Road
- Location: London, England
- President: Maria Vorontsova
- Website: slbi.org.uk

The South London Botanical Institute (SLBI) is an institution for the popularization of botany. It was founded in 1910 by Allan Octavian Hume, a former civil servant for the British Raj in India.

After returning from India to England in 1894, and after giving up ornithology, and turning vegetarian, Hume took an interest in British and European botany, and horticulture, which eventually led him to create the Institute in a large Victorian house in Norwood Road, Tulse Hill, South London, to provide an environment where anyone interested in plants, whether amateur or professional, could meet to develop their knowledge of botany.

The institute has changed little since its founding, and is of interest to historians as well as botanists. It contains the original library with an extensive collection of botanical books, monographs and journals and herbarium with a collection of dried, pressed plants from Britain and Europe, mounted on sheets accompanied by collecting details, to help members name or identify plants correctly. The lecture room was renovated and restored in 2015, including wallpaper with plant motifs designed by Augusta Ackerman. Further large-scale repairs of the building undertaken in 2023-24 because of subsidence. There is an active programme of talks, practical courses, and field excursions.

It maintains a small botanic garden containing examples of over 500 species. This was restored and re-developed by the institute's honorary Director, Frank Hatton Brightman and his wife Janice in the 1980s and became a member of the National Gardens Scheme.
