= Martha Elizabeth Newton =

British bryologist and cytologist (1941–2020)

- Born: 11 November 1941; Littlemoss, UK
- Died: 4 January 2020 (aged 78)
- Education: University College of North Wales, Bangor, UK
- Scientific career
- Fields: bryology, cytology

Martha Elizabeth Newton (11 November 1941 – 4 January 2020) was a British bryologist and botanist, specialising in cytology and field surveying.

== Early life and education ==
Newton was born in 1941 at her family's Lumm Farm, Littlemoss, Limehurst in Lancashire. She had one sister. She attended Littlemoss School and then Hyde County Grammar School for a year before transferring to the new Astley County Grammar School. She became interested in natural history as a child and her interest was encouraged by her parents. Newton attended University of Manchester and graduated in 1964 with a BSc, having specialised in botany and zoology. She was awarded a PhD by the University of Wales in 1967.

== Academic career ==
Her first academic post in 1964 was as a research assistant at University College of North Wales, Bangor with Tony (AJE) Smith. From 1967 until 1973 she worked for the British Antarctic Survey, then briefly on the chromosomes of mosquito (Aedes aegypti). From 1976 she held short-term posts at Manchester Museum, University of Manchester, University of Leeds, University of Liverpool and Liverpool World Museum. In 1990 she became a consultant and organised field courses.

During her doctoral work at Bangor she found her speciality in the cytology of mosses and liverworts as well as their identification and biogeography. The Australian cytologist Helen P. Ramsay was a visiting post-doctoral fellow for part of this time. She recorded the chromosome number of a large number of UK bryophytes during this time and was able to continue with this work until 1990 while in several academic posts where she undertook teaching, recording, editorial work and organised events. Her data was included in the monograph Liverwort flora of the British Isles.

Her expertise in bryophyte identification and biogeography led to her consultancy work for the Countryside Council for Wales in the 1990s. She undertook the baseline assessment of liverworts in north-west Wales in 2001 – 2003. Newton also pioneered the use of fixed quadrats for monitoring bryophytes. Between 2004 and 2012 she monitored Afon Ty-cerrig for the Environment Agency for one of the few detailed records of bryophytes both before and after a hydropower scheme was installed.

She joined the British Bryological Society in 1964 and was elected as a council member in 1977 and 1978. She was meetings secretary from 1980–88 and then general secretary from 1989–99.

The field courses that she ran for 40 years for the Field Studies Council and Scottish Field Studies Association about bryology were extremely popular despite containing extensive field-work followed by laboratory study in the evenings.

== Honours ==
In 1986 she was awarded a DSc by the University of Manchester. In 2003 she was awarded honorary membership of the British Bryological Society.

== Death ==
Newton died 4 January 2020 having lived in her family home in Stalybridge for most of her life.

== Selected publications ==
Newton was author or co-author of over 70 publications. These included monographs and book chapters as well as scientific papers. They included:

- AJE Smith and ME Newton (1966) Chromosome studies on some British and Irish mosses I. Transactions of the British Bryological Society 5 117 – 130
- ME Newton (1973) A taxonomic assessment of Bartramia, Breutelia and Exodokidium on South Georgia. British Antarctic Survey Bulletin 32 1 – 14
- ME Newton (1981) The bryophyte collections of Jethro Tinker (1788–1871) The Naturalist 106 111 – 117
- ME Newton (1984) The cytogenetics of bryophytes. In The experimental biology of bryophytes edited by AF Dyer and JG Duckett, Academic Press. pp 65 – 96
- AJ Wallace and ME Newton (1987) Heterochromatin diversity and cyclic responses to selective silver staining in Aedes aegypti (l.) Chromosoma 95 89 – 93
- ME Newton (1990) Practical Guide to Bryophyte Chromosomes BBS Special Volume 2

Newton also contributed to distribution maps of several bryophyte species in volumes of the Atlas of the Bryophytes of Britain and Ireland published between 1991 and 1994. Some of the specimens she collected are in the Natural History Museum herbarium.
