= Tony Bradshaw =

British ecologist (1926–2008)

Anthony David Bradshaw FRS (17 January 1926 – 21 August 2008) was a British evolutionary ecologist.

== Early life and education ==
Bradshaw was born in Kew, Surrey and educated at St Pauls School, Hammersmith. His father was H. Chalton Bradshaw, an architect. Bradshaw later read Botany at Jesus College, Cambridge and in 1947 moved to the University College of Wales, first as a research student in Aberystwyth University and then as a lecturer in the Department of Agricultural Botany at Bangor University. There he worked on the adaptation of plants to heavy metal pollution, demonstrating the ability of natural selection to bring about rapid evolutionary changes in natural grasses, even in very localized situations.

== Career and later life ==
In 1968 Bradshaw accepted the position of Chair of Botany at the University of Liverpool where he pioneered novel ideas in the field of restoration ecology to polluted sites recover without the need to cover them in imported topsoil. His work on the revegetation of china clay tips in Cornwall formed the basis of the techniques behind the Eden Project.

In 1982 he was elected a Fellow of the Royal Society. He was President of the British Ecological Society for 1982–83 and the Inaugural President of the Institute of Ecology and Environmental Management in 1991–94. In 1991 he delivered the Croonian Lecture to the Royal Society on Genostasis and the limits to Evolution. He was one of the founding trustees on the creation of National Museums Liverpool in 1986.

He married Betty Alliston and had three daughters.
