= Sandy M. Coppins =

British botanist and lichenologist

Alexandra "Sandy" M. Coppins is a Scottish lichenologist. She was president of the British Lichen Society from 2002 to 2004.

Coppins and her husband Brian Coppins have worked together for decades, making thousands of lichen surveys in Britain and running training courses about lichens. They have also promoted awareness of the importance of lichen communities and the appropriate management of their habitats especially woodlands and mountainous areas. She was involved with the British Lichen Society for many years including as Communication Secretary. Between 2004 and 2006 she was in charge of a project for Scottish Natural Heritage and the British Lichen Society to build a date base of the locations of lichens in Scotland. She also started the Lichen Apprentice Scheme in Scotland of workshops and training projects to develop a cohort of lichen consultants.

== Awards ==
Coppins was president the British Lichen Society from 2002 until 2004, the first woman in this role. She received the society's Ursula Duncan award in 2007.

In 2009 she received, together with her husband, the Plantlife Award for Contributions to the Conservation of Plant Diversity. In 2012 she was given an award for her ‘special contribution to the Species Action Framework’ from the Scottish Government. In 2016 she and Brian Coppins were jointly awarded the Lifetime Achievement Award for Nature in Scotland by the Royal Society for the Protection of Birds Scotland and also the Bob Saville Award from the Wildlife Information Centre in Bo'ness.

== Publications ==
Coppins is the co-author of the following books:

- Alexandra M. Coppins and B. J. Coppins Atlantic hazel : Scotland's special woodlands Atlantic Hazel Action Group, 2012
- Alexandra M. Coppins and B. J. Coppins Indices of ecological continuity for woodland epiphytic lichen habitats in the British Isles, British Lichen Society, 2002

She is also the co-author of several scientific publications including:

- Yahr, R., Coppins, B.J., Coppins, A.M. (2013) Transient population dynamics in the conservation priority species, Cladonia botrytes. Lichenologist, 45 265-276.
