= Seawardiella =

Scientific classification
- Domain: Eukaryota
- Kingdom: Fungi
- Division: Ascomycota
- Class: Lecanoromycetes
- Order: Teloschistales
- Family: Teloschistaceae
- Genus: Seawardiella; S.Y.Kondr., Kärnefelt & A.Thell (2018)

Type species
- Seawardiella lobulata (Flörke) S.Y.Kondr., Kärnefelt & A.Thell (2018)

Species
- S. lobulata S. tasmaniensis

Genus of lichens

Seawardiella is a genus of lichen-forming fungi in the family Teloschistaceae. It contains two species of corticolous (bark-dwelling) crustose lichens.

== Taxonomy ==
The genus was circumscribed by the lichenologists Sergey Kondratyuk, Ingvar Kärnefelt, and Arne Thell in 2018. The genus name honours the British lichenologist and plant ecologist Mark Seaward.

Seawardiella is in the subfamily Xanthorioideae of the family Teloschistaceae. Seawardiella is comparable to the genus Calogaya, yet it is distinguishable by its underdeveloped thalline sections and the absence of vegetative reproductive structures. In their classification of kingdom Fungi in the 2021 "Outline of Fungi and fungus-like taxa", Wijayawardene and colleagues do not recognise Seawardiella and instead lump it in synonymy with Calogaya.

== Description ==
Genus Seawardiella encompasses two species of lichens, with a form ranging from small rosette-like structures to less distinct formations, or even as tiny lobules situated at the base of the apothecia (fruiting bodies). These lichens are slightly elevated from their growth surface and exhibit colors from whitish grey or yellowish grey to yellow. The apothecia are typically numerous and prominent, often featuring a well-developed stalk-like structure known as a thalline stipe. The disc of the apothecia is flat or slightly convex, and the external layer (the thalline exciple) and the true internal layer (the true exciple) are composed of closely interwoven cells (paraplectenchymatous).

In terms of reproductive structures, Seawardiella lichens produce asci that typically contain eight spores. The spores are clear (hyaline) and feature two compartments (bipolarilocular) with a wide division (septum) between them. The chemical properties of these lichens vary based on colouration: those with a yellowish tint turn purple when exposed to a solution of potassium hydroxide (i.e., the K spot test), while others that are not yellowish also show a purple reaction with the same chemical. Both the layer above the spore-bearing tissue (epihymenium) and the true exciple have a purple reaction when treated with K.

== Habitat and distribution ==
Seawardiella lobulata is widely distributed in the Northern Hemisphere, whereas the distribution of the southern hemisphere species S. tasmaniensis is less well known.

== Species ==
Two species are assigned to Seawardiella:

- Seawardiella lobulata (Flörke) S.Y.Kondr., Kärnefelt & A.Thell (2018)
- Seawardiella tasmaniensis S.Y.Kondr., Kärnefelt & A.Thell (2018)
