= Nazaneen Ghaffar =

British television weather presenter (born 1985)

- Born: 9 June 1985 (age 41); Tunbridge Wells, Kent, England
- Education: Ravensbourne University
- Occupations: Weather presenter, TV Presenter
- Spouse: Charlie Rose (m. 2016)

Nazaneen Ghaffar (born 9 June 1985) is a British television weather presenter and reporter. She currently works for The New York Times, based in their London bureau. She previously appeared on the TalkTV channel, having previously presented for BBC South East Today, ITV West and Sky News.

== Early life ==
Ghaffar grew up in Royal Tunbridge Wells, Kent, where she attended St James' Primary School and Tunbridge Wells Girls' Grammar School. After completing her A-levels she studied for a BA (hons) degree in Broadcasting at the Ravensbourne College of Design and Communication in Greenwich. Her parents are Iranians who met in England.

== Television career ==
Upon graduating in 2006, her first television industry job was for Endemol in Bristol as a runner for the programme Deal or No Deal. After moving on to ITV West, her first on-screen opportunity was when she was asked to audition for a weather presenting position and trained at the Met Office. After 18 months of presenting for ITV she moved back to Kent to join the BBC's South East Today programme.

On 4 November 2010 it was announced that Ghaffar was leaving the BBC to join Sky News as presenter of The Weather on its Sunrise programme. She also presented forecasts for Sky News-produced 5 News on Channel 5 until 19 February 2012.

On 25 April 2022, Ghaffar left Sky News to join TalkTV on the weather segment after TalkTV News. Since 2024 she works for The New York Times weather team, as their weather reporter based in London.

== Personal life ==
Ghaffar married BBC South East reporter Charlie Rose in August 2016.
