= Ellie Miles =

English rugby union player (born 1999)

- Born: 7 February 1999 (age 27) Royal Tunbridge Wells, England
- School: Tunbridge Wells Girls' Grammar School

Rugby union career
- Position: Scrum-half
- Current team: Harlequins Ladies
Youth career
- 2014 2017: Tunbridge Wells
Senior career
Years	Team	Apps	(Points)
2017–	Harlequins		

Ellie Miles (born 7 February 1999) is a women's rugby union player from Royal Tunbridge Wells, Kent, England who plays for Harlequins Ladies in the Premier 15s as a scrum-half or wing. She started her career at her hometown club Tunbridge Wells RFC and helped coach rugby at her school, Tunbridge Wells Girls' Grammar School, before joining Harlequins Ladies. She has been noted as an up-and-coming female rugby player.

== Career ==
Miles first started playing rugby union at Tunbridge Wells Girls' Grammar School. She then joined Tunbridge Wells RFC, for whom her father had played as captain and coach, when they first set up their girls' youth team in 2014. She eventually became the captain of Tunbridge Wells under-18s and used her position to help run and coach the rugby club at her school. Later in that year, she was called up by the Kent Rugby Football Union to represent Kent under-18 Ladies and from there went to play for the London and South East under 18 Ladies team in both rugby union and rugby sevens. She also represented England South East in the rugby sevens competition at the School Games in 2016 at Loughborough University as well as in the national Division Series.

In 2016, she joined Women's Premiership club Aylesford Bulls Ladies and captained Kent U18s again but was injured before being selected for London and South-East trials. She remained with Aylesford during their rebrand as Harlequins Ladies for the first Premier 15s season. After starting the season playing for Harlequins Ladies II she made her debut against Worcester Valkyries as a substitute. Miles made her first Harlequins start in December against Waterloo Ladies, where she scored a try. In 2016, Miles was honoured by the Tunbridge Wells government.

== Personal life ==
In 2016, Miles was nominated for her rugby volunteering work for a Tunbridge Wells Borough Council civic award for sports achievement.
