= Chartered Institute of Ecology and Environmental Management =

UK-based professional body

The Chartered Institute of Ecology and Environmental Management (CIEEM, /ˈsaɪiːm/ SY-eem) is the professional body which represents and supports ecologists and environmental managers, mainly in the United Kingdom and Ireland, but also in mainland Europe and the rest of the world.

Established in 1991, CIEEM now has approaching 10,000 members drawn from local authorities, government agencies, industry, environmental consultancy, teaching/research and NGOs.

The Inaugural President from 1991–94 was the ecologist Professor Tony Bradshaw FRS.

Formerly known as IEEM, CIEEM attained a Royal Charter in 2013, being recognised for its high level of professionalism.

== Activities ==
CIEEM provides a variety of services (including conferences, training, events, guidance and advice) to develop the competency and standards of professional ecologists and environmental managers and also to promote ecology and environmental management as a profession.

CIEEM members are able to become Chartered Ecologists (CEcol) and/or Chartered Environmentalists (CEnv).

CIEEM is a constituent body of the Society for the Environment and the Environmental Policy Forum (EPF). CIEEM is also a member of IUCN-UK and IUCN Global.

CIEEM has Observer status for the United Nations Convention on Biological Diversity (CBD) and the United Nations Framework Convention on Climate Change (UNFCCC).

CIEEM is a member of the UN Decade of Ecosystem Restoration 2021-2030 partnership, and was a member of the UN Decade of Biodiversity 2011-2020 partnership, a signatory of the Countdown 2010 agreement to help save biodiversity, and a member of the 2010 International Year of Biodiversity UK partnership.

== Awards ==
The Institute makes a number of annual awards.

The CIEEM Medal is the Institute’s premier award and is presented in recognition of an outstanding single or lifelong contribution to the field of ecology and environmental management.

Five best practice awards recognise the highest standards of ecological and environmental management practice by CIEEM members.

The Tony Bradshaw Award, named after the Institute's first president, recognises exceptional projects in the Best Practice Awards above.

== Presidents ==
Source: CIEEM past presidents

- 2024–2027 – Penny Lewns
- 2021–2024 – Dr Richard Handley
- 2018–2021 – Professor Max Wade
- 2015–2018 – Dr Stephanie Wray
- 2012–2015 – John Box
- 2010–2012 – Professor Penny Anderson
- 2008–2010 – Professor Steve Ormerod
- 2006–2008 – Dr Andy Tasker
- 2004–2006 – Dr Chris Spray
- 2002–2004 – Sue Bell
- 2000–2002 – Professor David Hill
- 1997–2000 – Dr David Parker
- 1994–1997 – Professor David Goode
- 1991–1994 – Professor Tony Bradshaw

== See also ==
- Chartered Environmentalist
- List of environmental awards
