= Elizabeth Kungu =

UK bryologist

Elizabeth Mavis Kungu (née Field) is a bryologist specialising in taxonomy and field bryology. She was president of the British Bryological Society 2023–2024.

== Early life and education ==
Kungu graduated from Durham University in 1969 with a joint honours degree in Botany and Geography. She subsequently took an MSc in geography at Queen's University Belfast. She was awarded a doctorate in 2003 from University of Reading for a revision of the taxonomy of African Entodontaceae mosses, supervised by Royce Longton.

== Career ==
Kungu was first employed in 1972 at the Nature Conservancy, where she became interested in bryophytes, and subsequently at the Institute of Terrestrial Ecology. She surveyed and identified bryophytes in Scotland. From 1980 - 1990 she spent time looking after her young family and other concerns, returning to science in 1990 as an assistant lecturer in the Botany Department of the University of Nairobi. This allowed her to study the local bryophyte flora. Shen then moved to the University of Reading in 1994 and after 2003 to the Royal Botanic Gardens Edinburgh, where she remained for over 20 years.

Kungu was president of the British Bryological Society in 2023–2024.

== Publications ==
Kungu is the author or co-author of over 20 scientific publications. These include:

- Dalton N.J., Kungu E.M. & Long D.G. 2013. A taxonomic revision of the Hedwigiaceae Schimp. from the Sino-Himalaya. Journal of Bryology 35(2): 96–111.
- E.M. Kungu, Royce Longton and L. Bonner (2007) Chapter 12: Character reduction and peristome morphology in Endodontaceae: Constraints on an information source, in Pleurocarpous Mosses: Systematics and Evolution (Systematics Association Special Volumes) edited by Angela E. Newton and Raymond S. Tangney, CRC Press pp 247 – 266
- Bosanquet, S.D.S. Kungu, E.M. & Preston C.D. 2005. Extreme arable bryology: a brief visit to the cereal fields of Caithness. Field Bryology No. 86: 18–21.
