= Listed buildings in Malham Moor =

Malham Moor is a civil parish in the county of North Yorkshire, England. It contains nine listed buildings that are recorded in the National Heritage List for England. All the listed buildings are designated at Grade II, the lowest of the three grades, which is applied to "buildings of national importance and special interest". The parish is entirely rural, consisting of countryside and moorland, and it contains no settlements. Apart from a smelt chimney, all the listed buildings are houses and associated structures, and farmhouses.

== Buildings ==
Name and location	Photograph	Date	Notes
Shepherds Cottage; 54.10210°N 2.17348°W		1635	A house in gritstone, with quoins, stone gutter brackets, and a grey slate roof with shaped kneelers and gable coping. There are two storeys and three bays, and a rear outshut. On the front is a two-storey porch with a hipped roof, conaining a doorway, a re-set initialled datestone above the doorway, and another in the east wall. The windows are mullioned, those in the ground floor with hood moulds.
Middle House; 54.10902°N 2.14398°W		Mid 17th century	The house is in limestone and gritstone, with quoins and a stone slate roof. There are two storeys and four bays. On the front is a porch with a chamfered lintel and a recessed initialled plaque. The windows are mullioned, with some mullions missing, and some with hood moulds.
Darnbrook House; 54.13096°N 2.15654°W		1664	The house is in stone, with quoins, and a grey slate roof at the front and stone slate at the rear. There are two storeys, a range of three bays at the front, and an added two-bay parallel range at the rear. On the front is a porch containing stone benches, and an inner doorway with a chamfered surround and a slightly cambered head. There is one square window, and the other windows are mullioned, all with hood moulds.
New House; 54.07451°N 2.10462°W		Mid to late 17th century	A farmhouse and byre in gritstone, with quoins, and a stone slate roof with coped gables. The house has two storeys and two bays, and a rear outshut. On the front is a gabled porch with quoined jambs. Most of the windows are mullioned, with some mullions missing, and there is a sash window with a moulded lintel. In the byre is a doorway with a quoined surround, and a lintel with a chamfer and a shallow triangular head, a loading door and a small window.
Outbuilding west of Low Trenhouse; 54.08959°N 2.17067°W	—	Mid to late 17th century	A farmhouse, later an outbuilding, in limestone, with qioins and a stone slate roof. There are two storeys and three bays. On the front is a projecting gabled porch containing a doorway with a quoined surround, and a segmental arch under a square chamfered head. Above the doorway is a single-light window, and elsewhere there are sash windows, and mullioned windows with some mullions missing.
Stable with pigeon loft south of Middle House; 54.10883°N 2.14396°W	—	Early 18th century (probable)	The building is in gritstone, with quoins, through-stones, and a stone slate roof. There are two storeys and one bay. In the south wall is a doorway with a quoined surround and a large lintel, and to the left is a louvred opening. In the east gable is a blocked mullioned window, and above are four tiers of pigeon holes with perching stones. The north front contains a square forking hole.
Tarn House; 54.10110°N 2.16384°W		c. 1780	A country house, later extended and used for other purposes, in sandstone, with an eaves band, and a hipped grey slate roof. There are two storeys, a main range with fronts of three bays, and a later three-bay east range. On the entrance front is a projecting two-storey porch containing a doorway with a moulded architrave and a cornice on brackets. In the centre of the garden front is a two-storey canted bay window and a verandah. The windows are recessed sashes.
Smelt Chimney; 54.08793°N 2.17387°W		Late 18th to early 19th century	The chimney is in gritstone. It is circular, about 5 metres (16 ft) high, reducing in width about half-way up, and with protective coping. There is an opening on the north side.
Lee Gate; 54.07518°N 2.11215°W	—	Early to mid 19th century	The house is in gritstone with quoins and a stone slate roof. There are two storeys and four bays. The doorway has a plain surround, an entablature and a cornice, and the windows are sashes.
