= Brian William Fox =

Medical scientist and lichenologist

- Born: 1929; Ammanford, Carmarthenshire
- Died: 1999 (aged 69–70); New Mills, Derbyshire
- Education: Durham University
- Spouse: Mary Fox (died 1992)
- Scientific career
- Fields: cancer chemotherapy; botany
- Thesis: Lupin and related alkaloids: synthesis of 6 ethyl pyrrocoline

Brian W. Fox (1929–1999) was a professor of experimental chemotherapy at University of Manchester and the Paterson Institute who contributed to development of systematic methods for studying potential chemotherapy agents. He was also a keen botanist and lichenologist, involved in recording plant and lichen distributions in northern England.

== Personal life ==
Brian William Fox was born in Ammanford in Carmarthenshire, south Wales. The family moved to Lancashire in 1941. He studied chemistry at King's College, Durham University (now University of Newcastle-upon-Tyne), including for his doctoral degree. He undertook National Service.

== Career ==
In 1980 Fox was promoted to a personal chair in experimental chemotherapy at University of Manchester. He became deputy director of the Paterson Institute at Christie Hospital, Manchester. He developed standardised methodologies for screening compounds for anti-cancer activity.

Fox was also interested in plants and lichens. He collected plant specimens in the late 1940s to 1970s from northern England and donated around 1000 to Bolton Museum collection in 1984. These were part of the records for Travis's Flora of South Lancashire (1963).

He also recorded and taught about lichens. In 1981 he took part in an effort to record lichens on Scottish mountains. He later studied the lichens of Derbyshire and Cheshire in the UK, nearer his home. He also taught lichen identification. His records of changes to lichen distributions in Cheshire over 20 years showed how epiphytic lichens were moving to new areas as air pollution reduced. These were published as a book posthumously.

== Honours ==
Fox was president of the British Lichen Society, 1994–1996.

== Publications ==
Fox was the author or co-author of over 70 scientific publications about chemotherapeutic agents. These included:

- Woods, Ja; Hadfield, Ja; Pettit, Gr; Fox, Bw; McGown, At (April 1995). "The interaction with tubulin of a series of stilbenes based on combretastatin A-4". British Journal of Cancer. 71 (4): 705–711. doi:10.1038/bjc.1995.138. ISSN 0007-0920. PMC 2033763. PMID 7710932.
- McGown, Alan T.; Fox, Brian W. (March 1990). "Differential cytotoxicity of Combretastatins A1 and A4 in two daunorubicin-resistant P388 cell lines". Cancer Chemotherapy and Pharmacology. 26 (1): 79–81. doi:10.1007/BF02940301. ISSN 0344-5704.
- McGown, AlanT.; Fox, BrianW. (July 1986). "A proposed mechanism of resistance to cyclophosphamide and phosphoramide mustard in a Yoshida cell line in vitro". Cancer Chemotherapy and Pharmacology. 17 (3). doi:10.1007/BF00256688. ISSN 0344-5704.

He also authored books including:

- Brian W. Fox, Jonathan Guest and Andy Harmer (2003) The lichen flora of Cheshire and Wirral 92 pp. Nepa Books.ISBN 9780954599805
- Brian W. Fox (1996) Christie's: Christie Hospital and Holt Radium Institute, a brief history of a world famous cancer hospital, Christie Hospital NHS Trust, Manchester

The University of Manchester Library holds some of his personal papers and the documents he used as source material for his book on the history of the hospital.
