= Janet Simkin =

British lichenologist

- Education: University of Cambridge; University of Newcastle-upon-Tyne
- Scientific career
- Fields: ecology; lichenology

Janet Simkin is a plant ecologist and lichenologist at the University of Newcastle-upon-Tyne, UK. She was president of the British Lichen Society 2014–2016.

== Personal life ==
Janet W. Simkin became interested in lichens at school. She took an M. A. degree in natural sciences at University of Cambridge in 1978 and later a Ph.D. in 2007 at University of Newcastle.

== Career ==
Simkin initially worked in software management and development but in 1996 began working as a freelance ecological consultant. Her research on lichens in grassland contaminated by lead mining (calaminarian grassland) led to her doctoral degree in grassland ecology. From 2007 she has held various academic post at University of Newcastle as a plant ecologist with a specialist knowledge of plants, lichens and bryophytes as well as vegetation surveying. She was appointed as a part-time lecturer in 2019. Her research has focused on grasslands and woodlands, especially post-anthropogenic sites such as lead mines and churchyards. She has been involved in several projects to restore calaminarian grassland in the north Pennines and north Wales after metal mining operations have ceased. She is particularly involved in surveying and long-term studies of land restoration. She has published extensively on lichen taxonomy. Simkin is also involved in scientific outreach and runs several adult education classes for Natural History Society of Northumbria as well as undergraduate and postgraduate courses at the university and biological record structures through the British Lichen Society.

== Honours ==
She has been data manager at the British Lichen Society since 2000 for their recording scheme and spatial records database and was webmaster 2012 - 2020. She was the society's president from 2014 until 2016. In 2008 she received the Ursula Duncan Award for outstanding service to the society.

== Publications ==
Simkins is the author or co-author of more than 30 scientific publications. These include:

- Charlotte L. Outhwaite, Gary D. Powney, Tom A. August ... Janet Simkin and 31 other authors (2019) Annual estimates of occupancy for bryophytes, lichens and invertebrates in the UK, 1970–2015. Scientific Data 6 article 259
- Ellis, C.J, Coppins, B.J., Eaton, S. Simkin, J. (2013) Implications of ash dieback for associated epiphytes. Implications of ash dieback for associated epiphytes. Conservation Biology '27 898–901
- Bardgett, R.D., Smith, R.S., Shiel, R.S., Peacock, S., Simkin, J.M., Quirk, H., Hobbs, P.J. (2006) Parasitic plants indirectly regulate below-ground properties in grassland ecosystems. Nature 439 969–972

She is a member of the editorial board producing the revised and updated third edition of Lichens of Great Britain.
