= Walter Watson (lichenologist) =

British educator and lichenologist (1872–1960)

- Born: 1872; Greenfield, England
- Died: 1960 (aged 87–88)
- Education: University of London
- Scientific career
- Fields: Lichenology
- Workplaces: Taunton School
- Author abbrev. (botany): Walt.Watson

Walter Watson (1872–1960) was a British lichenologist who made contributions to the study of lichens and bryophytes in the United Kingdom. Born in Greenfield and educated at the University of London, Watson had a long career as an educator, culminating in his role as head of the science department at Taunton School. His research focused primarily on the botany of Somerset, where he settled, and he authored numerous papers on lichen and bryophyte floras. Watson's most notable work, the Census Catalogue of British Lichens (1953), became a foundational resource for mapping lichen distribution in Britain. He received recognition for his contributions to the field, including a Doctor of Science degree from the University of London and honorary associate status with the Linnean Society. Watson's work during periods of reduced interest in lichenology helped maintain continuity in the field, establishing him as a key figure in the history of British lichenology.

== Early life and education ==
Watson was born in Greenfield, near Oldham, in 1872. He initially worked in his family's business while attending night school. He later studied at the University of London, where he obtained his B.A. degree. Watson's career in education began in Larne, followed by positions in Sexeys, Bruton, Somerset, and eventually as the head of the science department at Taunton School in 1925.

== Contributions to botany and lichenology ==
Watson focused on the botany of Somerset, where he eventually settled. He served as president and recorder for the botanical section of the Somerset Natural History and Archaeological Society. Although he sent many of his early lichen collections to Thomas Hebden for identification, he appears to have taught himself lichenology. In a series of scientific publications from 1918 to 1936, he described the lichens and bryophytes in various habitats. Watson authored numerous papers, including studies on the lichen and bryophyte floras of Somerset. Although he retired from teaching in 1939, he continued to publish regularly. In 1946, he published a lichen flora of Yorkshire. Watson also took an interest in lichenicolous fungi (fungi that live on lichens). Perhaps enthused by Karl von Keissler's similar 1930 work on European members of this group, in 1948 Watson published a checklist of 148 lichenicolous fungi recorded from Great Britain and Ireland.

His research was recognised with a Doctor of Science degree from the University of London in 1922, and he was made an honorary associate of the Linnean Society in 1918. In 1950, he was elected vice-president of the cryptogamic section of the seventh botanical congress in Stockholm.

== Later work and legacy ==
Watson's final major work, the Census Catalogue of British Lichens (1953), became a foundation for the British Mycological Society's efforts in mapping lichen distribution in Britain. This work listed all 1466 species known to occur in the UK at the time, along with their distributions mapped to vice-county geographical divisions.

Watson's personal botanical collections were donated to various institutions:

- Flowering plants and lichens: County Museum in Taunton and Kew Gardens
- Bryophytes and library: British Museum

Watson's work during periods of reduced interest in lichenological study contributed to maintaining continuity in the field. In their 1977 work on the history of lichenology in the British Isles, David L. Hawksworth and Mark Seaward call Watson "undeniably one of the key figures in the history of British lichenology".

== Personal life ==
Watson had interests outside of botany, including painting, sketching, and supporting the Somerset County Cricket Club. He was survived by his widow, Adela Watson, and a daughter from his first marriage.

== Selected publications ==
Watson's publication history extends from 1909 to 1954.

- Watson, W. (1919). "The bryophytes and lichens of fresh water". The Journal of Ecology. 7 (1/2): 71. doi:10.2307/2255707. JSTOR 2255707.
- Watson, W. (1929). "The classification of lichens". New Phytologist. 28 (1): 1–36. doi:10.1111/j.1469-8137.1929.tb06745.x. JSTOR 2428040.
- Watson, Walter (1935). "Notes on lichens, mainly from Orkney, in the herbarium of the Royal Botanic Garden, Edinburgh". Transactions of the Botanical Society of Edinburgh. 31 (4): 505–520. doi:10.1080/13594863509441499.
- Watson, W. (1948). "List of British fungi parasitic on lichens or which have been included as lichens (or vice versa), with some notes on their characters and distribution". Transactions of the British Mycological Society. 31 (3–4): 305–339. doi:10.1016/S0007-1536(48)80016-1.
- Watson, W. (1953). Census Catalogue of British Lichens. London: Cambridge University Press.

== See also ==
- Category:Taxa named by Walter Watson (lichenologist)
