= Powter =

Powter may refer to:

- Daniel Powter (born 1971), Canadian musician
- Seán Powter (born 1997), Irish Gaelic footballer
- Susan Powter (born 1957), Australian-born American motivational speaker
- An archaic variant spelling of pewter
