= Tunbridge Wells Girls' Grammar School =

Tunbridge Wells Girls' Grammar School (TWGGS)

Location
- Southfield Road; Tunbridge Wells, Kent, TN4 9UJ; England; 51°08′41″N 0°15′30″E

Information
- Type: Foundation grammar school
- Motto: “Give your best”
- Established: 1905
- Local authority: Kent
- Department for Education URN: 118789 Tables
- Ofsted: Reports
- Headmistress: Katie Marchant
- Gender: Girls
- Age: 11 to 18
- Enrolment: approx. 1100
- Colours: Navy and Gold and Green and White
- Website: http://www.twggs.kent.sch.uk

Tunbridge Wells Girls' Grammar School (TWGGS), established in 1905, is an all-female selective school in Royal Tunbridge Wells, a town in Kent, England.

== History ==
The school was established in 1905.

== About the school ==
The "eleven plus" examination represents the main entrance criterion, along with residence within the catchment area (1.6 miles as of 2015) A small number of spaces are reserved for students outside the catchment area, which are called governess places. These are generally only given to students with high marks in the 11+. The current head mistress is Mrs K Marchant.

The school is a specialist school in Music with English. The school has taken part in many sporting events such as football, curling, hockey, netball and dance. There are 6 forms per year named 'T', 'W', 'S', 'G' 'Y' and 'B', and each class has around 30 pupils.

== Notable former pupils ==
- Ellie Beaven, actress
- Jo Brand, stand-up comedian
- Nazaneen Ghaffar, television weather presenter
- Rosalind Maskell, microbiologist
- Ellie Miles, rugby player
- Virginia Wade, tennis player

== See also ==
- Tonbridge Grammar School
- Tunbridge Wells Boys' Grammar School
- The Skinners' School
- The Judd School
- Weald of Kent Grammar School
- The Skinners’ Kent Academy
