= Mark Seaward =

British ecologist and lichenologist

Mark Richard David Seaward
- Born: 10 August 1938 (age 88)
- Education: University of Birmingham, University of Bradford
- Awards: Acharius Medal (2006)
- Scientific career
- Fields: Ecology, lichenology
- Author abbrev. (botany): Seaward

Mark Richard David Seaward (born 10 August 1938) is a British ecologist and lichenologist (the study of lichens). He was awarded the Acharius Medal in 2006 for lifetime contributions to lichenology.

== Life and career ==
Seaward was born in Lincoln, England. He attended the University of Birmingham, graduating in 1959, and obtained an education diploma from the same institution a year later. While teaching at the Loughborough Training College, he obtained an MSc from the University of Nottingham in 1965. In 1967 he moved on to Trinity and All Saints College. Seaward earned a PhD from the University of Bradford in 1972. His thesis was about urban lichen ecology. He started employment at that university in 1974. Seaward carried out the first national lichen mapping program. In 1989 he was appointed as chair of Professor of Environmental Biology. He has continued as an honorary research professor since his retirement.

== Recognition ==
The genus Seawardiella honours Seaward. Species that have been named after him include: Granulopyrenis seawardii Aptroot & Sipman (2001); Ramalina seawardii Aptroot & Sipman (2001); Enterographa seawardii Lücking & Henssen (2004); Dolichocarpus seawardii Aptroot (2008); Caloplaca seawardii S.Y.Kondr., Kärnefelt & A.Thell (2009); and Graphis seawardii Flakus & Kukwa (2013).

He has received an honorary degree from the University of Wroclaw. David H.S. Richardson has described his impact on the field of lichenology as "tremendous".

== Selected publications ==
- Seyd, Edmund L.; Seaward, Mark R.D. (1984). "The association of oribatid mites with lichens". Zoological Journal of the Linnean Society. 80 (4): 369–420. doi:10.1111/j.1096-3642.1984.tb02552.x.
- Aptroot, André; Seaward, Mark R.D. (1999). "Annotated checklist of Hongkong Lichens" (PDF). Tropical Bryology. 17: 57–101.
- Ellis, Christopher J.; Coppins, Brian J.; Dawson, Terence P.; Seaward, Mark R.D. (2007). "Response of British lichens to climate change scenarios: Trends and uncertainties in the projected impact for contrasting biogeographic groups". Biological Conservation. 140 (3–4): 217–235. doi:10.1016/j.biocon.2007.08.016.
- Thell, Arne; Crespo, Ana; Divakar, Pradeep K.; Kärnefelt, Ingvar; Leavitt, Steven D.; Lumbsch, H. Thorsten; Seaward, Mark R.D. (2012). "A review of the lichen family Parmeliaceae – history, phylogeny and current taxonomy". Nordic Journal of Botany. 30 (6): 641–664. doi:10.1111/j.1756-1051.2012.00008.x.
- Seaward, M.R.D. (2014). "Lichens as Agents of Biodeterioration". Recent Advances in Lichenology. New Delhi: Springer India. pp. 189–211. doi:10.1007/978-81-322-2181-4_9. ISBN 978-81-322-2180-7.
