= J. L. Simkin =

British biochemist (??–1991)

Dr Julius Leonard Simkin FRSE (d.1991) was a 20th century British biochemist. In authorship he was known as J. L. Simkin.

== Life ==
He was born in England in the 1920s. He studied Science at Liverpool University graduating BSc around 1950.

In 1954 he received a doctorate (PhD) in Physiology from the University of Birmingham.

He was senior lecturer in Biochemistry at Aberdeen University.

In 1979 he was elected a Fellow of the Royal Society of Edinburgh. His proposers were Hamish Keir, G. A. Garton, P. E. Weatherley, C. F. Mills, Peter Hobson, J. D. Matthews, F. C. Frazer and P.T. Grant.

He died on 19 January 1991.

== Publications ==
- Vitamin B12 and Protein Biosynthesis (1959)
- The Incorporation of Radioactive Amino Acids into Protein (1960)
- A Broad View of Proteins (1964)
