= Tunbridge Wells Grammar School for Boys =

Location
- St John's Rd, Tunbridge Wells, Kent, TN4 9XB; Seal Hollow Rd, Sevenoaks, Kent, TN13 3SN; 51°09′N 0°16′E

Information
- Type: Grammar School
- Motto: Faber est quisque suæ fortunæ (Every man is the maker of his own fortune)
- Established: 1956
- Local authority: Kent
- Department for Education URN: 118790 Tables
- Ofsted: Reports
- Chair of Governors: Philip Drew
- Headteacher: Amanda Simpson
- Gender: Boys (Aged 11-16); Mixed (Aged 16-18)
- Age: 11 to 18
- Enrolment: 1,504
- Houses: Ightham, Knole, Hever, Scotney
- Colours: Maroon and Gold
- Publication: Eclectics (former)
- Website: http://www.twgsb.org.uk

Tunbridge Wells Grammar School for Boys (TWGSB) is a grammar school in Royal Tunbridge Wells, Kent, England.

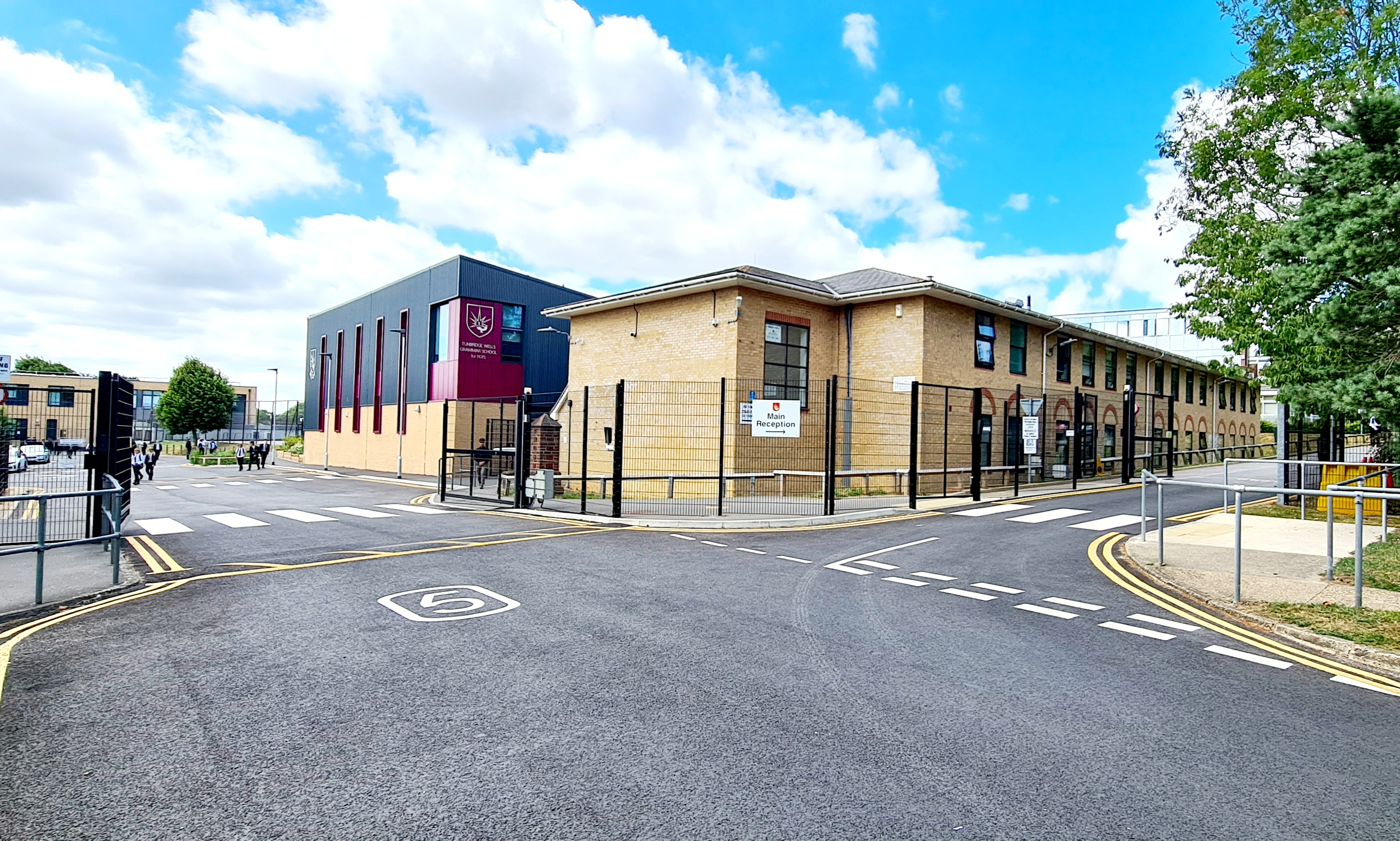
TWGSB, Main Entrance, St John's Road, Tunbridge Wells

Founded as a technical school in 1956, TWGSB became a grammar school in 1982. Despite having been a grammar school for decades, it is still commonly referred with the nickname "Tech".

The current enrolment of 2,076 pupils (of which 510 are in the sixth form) is spread across two sites: the main site in Tunbridge Wells and the annexe in Sevenoaks. The lower school is all boys (aged 11–16 years) whilst the sixth form is mixed (aged 16–18 years).

Admission to the lower school is selective with pupils required to pass the eleven-plus selection test administered by Kent County Council. Successful pupils fall within the top 25 per cent of the ability range upon entrance.

Over its history, the school has had the following headteachers: Amanda Simpson (2017–present), Simon Marsh (Acting Headteacher, January–August 2017), John Harrison (2006–2016), Derek Barnard (1988–2006), Mr J Hodnett (1976–1988), and Mr HW Davies (1956–1975).

== Academic ==
TWGSB offers a broad range of subjects at both GCSE and A-Level. The vast majority of boys remain at the school after completing their GCSEs in order to undertake A-Levels.

In September 2007, TWGSB became a humanities college and received: (a) a one-off sum towards a capital project, (b) recurring funding towards developments, and (c) recurring funding towards community developments.

The most recent OFSTED Report, dated November 2021, assessed the school's overall effectiveness as "Good".

== School identity ==
The school's Latin motto, Faber est quisque suæ fortunæ, means 'Every man is the maker of his own fortune'.

All pupils are assigned a house upon entering the school. The four houses, named after local stately homes and castles, are: Ightham (Red), Knole (Yellow), Hever (Green), and Scotney (Blue).

The houses compete throughout the year for the House Cup (awarded to the house with the highest number of house points) and the Sports Cup (awarded to the house that wins sports day).

The school's prefect system delegates the enforcement of rules of conduct to Sixth Formers.

== Facilities ==
As part of a £7.5 million expansion project, TWGSB embarked on a significant redevelopment. At the Tunbridge Wells site, new buildings and improvements include:

- A two-storey teaching centre for maths, ICT, and food tech.
- A purpose-built Sixth Form Centre.
- A reconfigured Main Building with expanded dining hall.
- A five-court Sports Centre

The school also has its own cricket, rugby, football and softball pitches and a new 3G pitch. In addition to the above, TWGSB also opened an annexe in Sevenoaks

== Extracurricular activities ==
TWGSB offers a large range of clubs and societies (including sports, drama, and music), and also has a school orchestra and jazz band.

The school's previously produced an annual magazine, 'Eclectics', which has now ceased publication.

TWGSB competes in several sports and runs a number of teams.

There are two student councils: the School Council and the Sixth Form Council.

== Notable former pupils ==
- Kieran O’Doore, Former member of the Provisional Irish Republican Army
- Rt. Hon. Nick Brown, MP for Newcastle East
- Oliver Chris, actor, The Office
- Dr Brian Coppins, botanist and lichenologist
- Martin Corry, England rugby captain and Leicester Tiger
- Luke Howell, professional footballer with Lincoln City F.C.
- Joe Wilkinson, comedian
- George Briley, WPC Powerlifting U20 World Champion 2014
- John Kerrigan, CEO of Fowler Welch Our Team - Fowler Welch

== See also ==
- Tunbridge Wells Girls' Grammar School
- The Skinners' School
- St Gregory's Catholic School
