= Arthur Edward Wade =

British museum curator and botanist

Arthur Edward (Edwin) Wade FLS
- Born: 22 November 1895; Leicester, UK
- Died: 20 April 1989 (aged 93); Rotorua, New Zealand
- Citizenship: British
- Known for: ecologist
- Scientific career
- Fields: botany, lichenology
- Institutions: National Museum of Wales
- Author abbrev. (botany): A.E.Wade

Arthur Wade was a botanist and lichenologist. He was Deputy Curator in the Department of Botany at the National Museum of Wales from 1920 until 1961. He was president of the British Lichen Society from 1964 until 1966.

== Early life, education and personal life ==
Arthur Wade was born in Leicester on 22 November 1895. He attended a grammar school in Leicester and then the local technical college. He became interested in botany as a child and organised collections of wild plants that he had pressed to preserve. This enthusiasm was supported by the botany curator at Leicester Museum, A. R. Horwood, and Wade worked informally with him after leaving school. In 1915 he became a member of the Botanical Exchange Club (which later became the Botanical Society of Britain and Ireland).

In 1917 he and Florence Annie Elizabeth Woods (died 1961) married. In 1981 he emigrated to be with family in New Zealand.

He painted in watercolours and oils and was a founder member of the South Wales Group of artists. His works were exhibited at the Royal Cambrian Academy, the South Wales Art Society and the Swansea and Newport Art Society. Several of his paintings are in the collection of Amgueddfa Cymru – Museum Wales.

== Career ==
In 1912 Wade was apprenticed as an apprentice printing compositor. In 1917 he joined the army, posted to France and was injured to his right elbow and face during the First World War. The consequence of the injuries was that he could no longer work as a compositor and also had to learn to draw and paint with his left hand. In 1919 he started a course at Northampton Technical College about business management.

In 1920 he was successful in his application for a post as assistant in the herbarium at National Museum of Wales. Wade's subsequent career was spent in the Department of Botany at the main site in Cardiff until he retired in 1961. In 1943 he was promoted to assistant keeper (later termed deputy curator). He joined the British Bryological Society in 1946 and was a member of its council from 1954 until 1955. He continued in an honorary research position at the museum after his retirement.

As well as his scientific research and publications, he developed the museum's herbarium. There were a few thousand specimens when he was appointed, but 200,000 including nearly 50,000 bryophytes by the time he retired. He organised obtaining these from several collectors such as the purchase of the bryophyte herbaria of J. A. Wheldon (17,000 specimens), D. A. Jones (10,000) and A. R. Horwood (2,000) were purchased in addition to the donation of specimens collected by H. H. Knight (6,000). He also collected many specimens himself at weekends.

He worked on many types of plant. He was an expert on Symphytum and Myosotis within the Boraginaceae as well as mosses and lichens (especially Caloplaca).

Wade conducted field courses about lichens for the Field Studies Council. In 1958, when the British Lichen Society was founded, Wade became its honorary secretary until 1963. After moving to New Zealand in the 1980s he started a collection of local lichens.

== Publications ==
- A. Wade 1919 The flora of Aylestone and Narborough Bogs Trans. Leicester Lit. Phil. Soc. 20 20–46
- H. A. Hyde and A. Wade 1934 Welsh Flowering Plants
- H. A. Hyde and A. Wade 1936 Lichens of Glamorgan
- H. A. Hyde and A. Wade 1940 Welsh Ferns
- A. Wade 1954 Lichens of Pembrokeshire
- A. Wade 1958 Lichens of Carmarthenshire
- A. Wade 1970 Flora of Monmouth
- Arthur E. Wade, Quentin O. N. Kay and R. Gwynne Ellis 1990 Flora of Glamorgan completed and published posthumously

Collema to the first issue, following it up in succeeding years with papers on The Lichenologist Alectoria (1959), Anaptychia and Physcia (1960) and Ramalina (1961).

== Awards and honours ==
In 1925 he was elected a fellow of the Linnean Society of London. From 1955 to 1956 Wade was president of the Cardiff Naturalists' Society. In 1958 he was awarded an honorary M.Sc. for his services to botany by the University of Wales. In 1962 he was made an honorary member of the Botanical Society of the British Isles in 1962, and he was president from 1964 to 1965. In 1971 Wade became the first Honorary member of the British Lichen Society.

The lichen genus Wadeana is named after him.
