= Peter Crittenden =

British lichenologist

Peter Crittenden is a British lichenologist. His research largely concerns the ecophysiology of lichens. Crittenden is known for using new techniques to study lichens, such as the use of 3D printing and X-ray computed tomography to study lichen structure and development. He served as the senior editor of the scientific journal The Lichenologist from the years 2000–2016; and still serves on the editorial board for the journal Fungal Ecology. Crittenden was the president of the British Lichen Society in 1998–1999, and president of the International Association for Lichenology from 2008 to 2012. He was awarded the Acharius Medal at the 10th International Mycological Congress in Bangkok in 2014, for his lifetime achievements in lichenology.

== Biography ==
Crittenden studied botany at the University of London, where he graduated in 1971. He spent two summer vacation studentships working under the supervision of Peter Wilfred James. For his PhD, he moved to Sheffield to study ecology under David Read, researching the effect of sulphur dioxide pollution on pasture grasses. Crittenden started working with lichens after moving to Canada as a research fellow at McMaster University. With his supervisor Ken Kershaw, he studied the role of lichens in the nitrogen cycle in boreal-arctic ecosystems. Much of his research involved determining nitrogenase activity in the mat-forming lichen Stereocaulon paschale. Crittenden eventually settled into a lectureship at the University of Nottingham in 1981, where he remains and is Leverhulme Emeritus Professor as of 2021.

== Editorship ==
Peter Crittenden served as senior editor of The Lichenologist from 2000 to 2019. During his tenure, he significantly impacted the journal and the field of lichenology. He initiated the modernisation of the journal's layout and printing in 2001, increasing its academic standing and impact factor from around 0.9 to over 1.5. Under his leadership, the journal introduced thematic issues and encouraged longer, more comprehensive papers.

Crittenden implemented several important editorial changes, including the adoption of effective electronic publication, obligate registration of new fungal names, and a policy to reject "single naked species descriptions" from 2016 onwards. These changes helped to improve the quality and impact of the research published in the journal.

During Crittenden's editorship, The Lichenologist published 1197 papers, nearly matching the number published under his three predecessors combined (1256 papers from 1958–1999). The journal also made significant contributions to lichen taxonomy, with 2069 new lichen species described between 2000 and 2019, representing 69% of all new species described in the journal since its inception in 1958.

Crittenden collaborated with James D. Lawrey, editor of The Bryologist, to increase the quality of both journals, further enhancing the impact of lichenological research.

== Selected publications ==
- Crittenden, P.; Porter, Neil (1991). "Lichen-forming fungi: potential sources of novel metabolites". Trends in Biotechnology. 9 (1): 409–414. doi:10.1016/0167-7799(91)90141-4. PMID 1367745.
- Ellis, Christopher J.; Crittenden, Peter D.; Scrimgeour, Charles M.; Ashcroft, Carl (2003). "The natural abundance of 15N in mat-forming lichens". Oecologia. 136 (1): 115–123. doi:10.1007/s00442-003-1201-z. PMID 12695900. S2CID 8630634.
- Ellis, Christopher J.; Crittenden, Peter D.; Scrimgeour, Charles M. (2004). "Soil as a potential source of nitrogen for mat-forming lichens". Canadian Journal of Botany. 82 (1): 145–149. doi:10.1139/b03-144.
- Seymaur, Fabian A.; Crittenden, Peter; Dyer, Paul S. (2005). "Sex in the extremes: lichen-forming fungi". Mycologist. 19 (2): 51–58. doi:10.1017/S0269-915X(05)00201-6 (inactive 12 July 2025).
