= Ruth Ainsworth =

British writer

- Born: Ruth Gallard Ainsworth; 16 October 1908; Manchester, England
- Died: 16 May 1984 (aged 75)
- Education: Ipswich High School
- Occupation: Writer
- Known for: Author of children's books, Radio Script writer
- Parent(s): Percy Clough Ainsworth and Gertrude Fisk
- Relatives: Geoffrey Clough Ainsworth (brother)

Ruth Gallard Ainsworth (16 October 1908 – 16 May 1984) was a British writer, of over seventy children's books and numerous radio scripts.

== Life ==
Ainsworth was born in Manchester, in 1908, the second child (and first daughter) of Methodist minister Rev. Percy Clough Ainsworth and Gertrude Fisk of Pendleton, her older brother being mycologist Geoffrey Clough Ainsworth.

Ainsworth's father died on 1 July 1909 from typhoid aged 36. Soon after the family moved to 2 High Cliff Villas, Cobbold Road, Felixstowe. Ainsworth enrolled at Ipswich High School, Woolverstone where she studied between September 1924 and July 1926. She later attended the Froebel Training Centre in Leicester.

On 29 March 1935 she married chemist Frank Lathe Gilbert in Leicester. On 7 September 1936, while in Lancaster, she gave birth to twin sons: Christopher Gallard Gilbert (furniture historian and museum curator) and Oliver Lathe Gilbert (urban ecologist and lichenologist). She had a third son Richard Frank Gilbert.

The Gilberts initially settled in London, but their house was bombed in World War II. They relocated to Porthmadog. Latterly the Gilberts lived in Corbridge, Northumberland.

Ainsworth died in 1984 aged 75. Her ashes were scattered in a stream in Wasdale.

== Work ==
Ainsworth re-told classic fairy tales, as well as new stories of her own.

Ainsworth was a scriptwriter for Listen with Mother, a popular BBC children's programme. Some were published as Ruth Ainsworth's Listen with Mother Tales. Astrid Walford (illustrator). William Heinemann. 1951..

Some of her stories were televised as marionette plays.

== Bibliography ==
The series "Books for me to read", written with Ronald Ridout, has the secondary title "A book for me to read" on each cover.

It is not clear if the color sub-series ("Red book 1" etc.) is used throughout its history. Some or all of the books were republished with slightly different titles, for example Pony Pony (London: Bancroft, 1965) as Pony, pony : my sixth reading book (Bristol: Purnell, 1983) while still in "Books for me to read. Blue series." Most or all of these books were published in the initial teaching alphabet.

- Tales about Tony. London: Epworth Press. 1936.
- The Gingerbread House. London: Epworth Press. 1938.
- Mr. Popcorn's Friends. London: Epworth Press. 1938.
- The Ragamuffins. London: Epworth Press. 1939.
- Richard's First Term. A school story. London: Epworth Press. 1940.
- All Different. Poems for children ... Linda Bramley (illustrator). London; Toronto: William Heinemann. 1947.
- Five and a Dog. London: Epworth Press. 1949.
- Ruth Ainsworth's Listen with Mother Tales. Astrid Walford (illustrator). London: William Heinemann. 1951.
- Rufty Tufty the Golliwog ... Dorothy Craigie (illustrator). London: William Heinemann. 1952.
- The Ruth Ainsworth Readers. London: William Heinemann. 1953.
- The Evening listens. [Poems.] London: William Heinemann. 1953.
- More about Charles, and other stories. From "Listen with Mother" ... Sheila Hawkins (illustrator). London: William Heinemann. 1954.
- Rufty Tufty at the Seaside ... Dorothy Craigie (illustrator). London: William Heinemann. 1954.
- Charles Stories, and others. From "Listen with Mother" ... Sheila Hawkins (illustrator). London: William Heinemann. 1954.
- Three Little Mushrooms. Four puppet plays ... London: William Heinemann. 1955.
- More Little Mushrooms. Four puppet plays ... London: William Heinemann. 1955.
- The Snow Bear, etc. London: William Heinemann. 1956.
- Rufty Tufty goes camping ... Dorothy Craigie (illustrator). London: William Heinemann. 1956.
- with Ronald Ridout (1956–58). The Look ahead Readers ... Vol. bk. 1, 3–8. John Mackay (illustrator). London: William Heinemann.
- with Ronald Ridout (1956). Look ahead Supplementary Readers. London: William Heinemann.-
- Five Listen with Mother Tales about Charles ... Matvyn Wright (illustrator). London: Adprint. 1957.
- Rufty Tufty runs away. Dorothy Craigie (illustrator). London: Heinemann. 1957.
- Nine Drummers drumming. John Mackay (illustrator). London: William Heinemann. 1958.
- Rufty Tufty flies high ... D. G. Valentine (illustrator). London: Heinemann. 1959.
- Rufty Tufty's Island. D. G. Valentine (illustrator). London: Heinemann. 1960.
- Cherry Stones. A book of fairy stories. Pat Humphreys (illustrator). London: Heinemann. 1960.
- Lucky dip : a selection of stories and verses. Geraldine Spence (illustrator). London: Penguin. 1961.
- Rufty Tufty and Hattie. D. G. Valentine (illustrator). London: Heinemann. 1962.
- Far-Away Children. Felice Trentin (illustrator). London: Heinemann. 1963.
- The Wolf who was Sorry. Doritie Kettlewell (illustrator). London: Heinemann. 1964.
- Red book 1, Jill and Peter. Books for me to read. Ingeborg Meyer-Rey (illustrator). London; printed in Holland: Bancroft & Co. 1964.-
- Rufty Tufty makes a House. D. G. Valentine (illustrator). London: Heinemann. 1965.
- Lucky dip. A selection of stories and verses by Ruth Ainsworth. Geraldine Spence (illustrator). Harmondsworth: Penguin Books. 1965.
- Daisy the cow ... Sarah Garland (illustrator). London: Hamish Hamilton. 1966.
- Books for me to read: Green Series - Susan's House. London, printed in Holland: Initial Teaching Publishing Co. 1966.
- Books for me to read: Green Series - Huff the Hedgehog. London, printed in Holland: Initial Teaching Publishing Co. 1966.
- Horse on wheels. Janet Duchesne (illustrator). Hamish Hamilton. 1966.
- Jack Frost. Jane Paton (illustrator). Heinemann. 1966.
- In woods and fields;. Jennie Corbett (illustrator). London: Heinemann. 1967.
- Down the lane. Jennie Corbett (illustrator). London; Santa Cruz de Tenerife printed: Heinemann. 1967.
- Roly the railway mouse ... Leslie Atkinson (illustrator). London; Santa Cruz de Tenerife printed: Heinemann. 1967.
- More tales of Shellover. Antony Maitland (illustrator). London: André Deutsch. 1968.
- The bicycle wheel. Shirley Hughes (illustrator). London: Hamish Hamilton. 1969.
- In the park. Jennie Corbett (illustrator). London: Heinemann. 1969.
- My monarch book of Snow White and the seven dwarfs. London: Purnell. 1969.
- In your garden. Jennie Corbett (illustrator). London: Heinemann. 1969.
- My monarch book of Puss in Boots. London: Purnell. 1969.
- My monarch book of Beauty and the Beast. London: Purnell. 1969.
- My Monarch book of colours and sounds. Paulton, Somerset: Purnell. c. 1969.
- By pond and stream. Jennie Corbett (illustrator). London: Heinemann. 1969.
- The Noah's ark. Elsie Wrigley (illustrator). London: Lutterworth Press. 1969.
- Llyfrau lliw cyfres y brython. Translated by Jennie Tomas. Liverpool: Hugh Evans. 1969.
- Look, do and listen. Bernadette Watts (illustrator). London: Heinemann. 1969.
- The Ruth Ainsworth Book. Shirley Hughes (illustrator). London: Heinemann. 1970.
- The phantom cyclist, and other stories. Antony Maitland (illustrator). London: Deutsch. 1971.
- Fairy gold : favourite fairy tales retold for the very young. Barbara Hope Steinberg (illustrator). London: Heinemann. 1972.
- Another lucky dip. Shirley Hughes (illustrator). Harmondsworth: Penguin. 1973.
- Three's company. Prudence Seward (illustrator). Guildford: Lutterworth Press. 1974.
- The phantom fisherboy : tales of mystery and magic. Shirley Hughes (illustrator). London: Deutsch. 1974.
- compiled by Ruth Ainsworth (1975). Three bags full. Sally Long (illustrator). London: Heinemann.
- More tales of Shellover. Antony Maitland (illustrator). Harmondsworth: Puffin Books. 1976.
- The bear who liked hugging people, and other stories. Antony Maitland (illustrator). London: Heinemann. 1976.
- Up the airy mountain : stories of magic. Eileen Browne (illustrator). London: Heinemann. 1977.
- Puss in boots. Maidenhead: Purnell. 1977.
- Little Red Riding Hood. Maidenhead: Purnell. 1977.
- Beauty and the beast. Maidenhead: Purnell. 1977.
- The sleeping beauty. Maidenhead: Purnell. 1977.
- Jack and the beanstalk. Maidenhead: Purnell. 1977.
- Snow White. Maidenhead: Purnell. 1977.
- Mr Jumble's toy shop. Paul Wrigley (illustrator). Guildford: Lutterworth Press. 1978.
- The talking rock. Joanna Stubbs (illustrator). London: Deutsch. 1979.
- Goldilocks and the three bears. Maidenhead: Purnell. 1980.
- The mysterious Baba and her magic caravan : two stories. Joan Hickson (illustrator). London: Deutsch. 1980.
- Mermaids' tales. Dandi Palmer (illustrator). Guildford: Lutterworth Press. 1980.
- The three little pigs. Maidenhead: Purnell. 1980.
- The pirate ship : and other stories. Shirley Hughes (illustrator). London: Heinemann. 1980.
- Cinderella. Maidenhead: Purnell. 1980.
- Rumplestiltskin. Maidenhead: Purnell. 1980.
- Hansel and Gretel. Maidenhead: Purnell. 1980.
- The phantom roundabout : and other ghostly tales. Shirley Hughes (illustrator). [Sevenoaks]: Knight. 1981 [c 1977].
- The mysterious Baba; and, Her Magic caravan. Joan Hickson (illustrator). London: Beaver. 1982 [c 1980].
- with Ronald Ridout. (1983) [c 1965]. A pram and a bicycle : my fifth reading book. Bristol: Purnell.
- with Ronald Ridout. (1983) [c 1965]. A name of my own : my fourth reading book. Bristol: Purnell.
- with Ronald Ridout. (1983) [c 1965]. Jill and Peter : my first reading book. Bristol: Purnell.
- The ten tales of Shellover. Antony Maitland (illustrator). Harmondsworth: Puffin. 1967 [c 1963].
- with Ronald Ridout. (1983) [c 1965]. The house of hay : my second reading book. Bristol: Purnell.
- with Ronald Ridout. (1983) [c 1965]. Come and play : my third reading book. Bristol: Purnell.
- The little yellow taxi and his friends. Gary Inwood (illustrator). London: Hippo. 1989 [c 1982].
