= Brian Fox (artist) =

American painter

Brian Fox is an American painter who has created portraits of many entertainment and sports celebrities.

== Career ==
Fox served as the commemorative artist for Major League Baseball’s 2007, 2008 and 2009 All Star Games, as well as the official artist for the 2007 World Series.

In 2009, Fox was hired to produce “Original Artist Sketch Cards” for TOPPS popular Series 1 Baseball Cards. Brian completed the sketches of forty current and retired baseball players, including Babe Ruth, Mickey Mantle, Jonathan Papelbon, Josh Hamilton, and Ichiro Suzuki.

Also in 2009, Fox was commissioned by the National Hockey League to produce original artwork for the 2010 NHL Winter Classic. Fox’s artwork appeared on the cover of the limited edition game day program. The painting was auctioned on NHL Auctions, on NHL.com. A portion of the proceeds benefited Hockey Fights Cancer and Curt’s Pitch for ALS.

Most recently, Fox collaborated with Olympic hockey player Jim Craig to create a collection of original artwork commemorating the 30 year anniversary of “Miracle on Ice” at the 1980 Winter Olympics.

Fox's clients have also included the National Football League. Disney, Foxwoods Resort Casino, Caesars Palace in Las Vegas and Mirage Hotel in Las Vegas.

Fox has helped raise money for charities and non-profits such as the ALS Association, Major League Baseball Players Trust, Josh Beckett Foundation, Ryan Howard Family Foundation, Providence College, Hockey Fights Cancer and the Jackie Robinson Foundation.

=== Work in collections ===
Athletes:

- Jackie Robinson Foundation
- Tom Brady
- Matt Light
- Curt Schilling
- Josh Beckett
- Michael Phelps
- Johan Santana
- Ichiro Suzuki
- Jim Thorpe
- Ray Allen
- George St. Pierre, Mixed Martial Arts Champion
- Alan Garcia, Thoroughbred Horse Racing Jockey

Celebrities and CEOs:

- Morgan Freeman
- Charlton Heston
- Keith Richards
- Ray Charles
- Johnny Depp
- Larry Lucchino – CEO of Boston Red Sox
- Oz Scott – Director of C.S.I. NY
- George Horowitz, President Everlast Worldwide Inc.
- Bill Casner, CEO WinStar Farms
- Charlie Jacobs, owner Boston Bruins

=== Education ===
Fox graduated from the UMass Dartmouth in 1990 with a bachelor's degree in Fine Arts.

Fox also has a Black belt in Shotokan Karate.
