= The Lichenologist =

Scientific journal

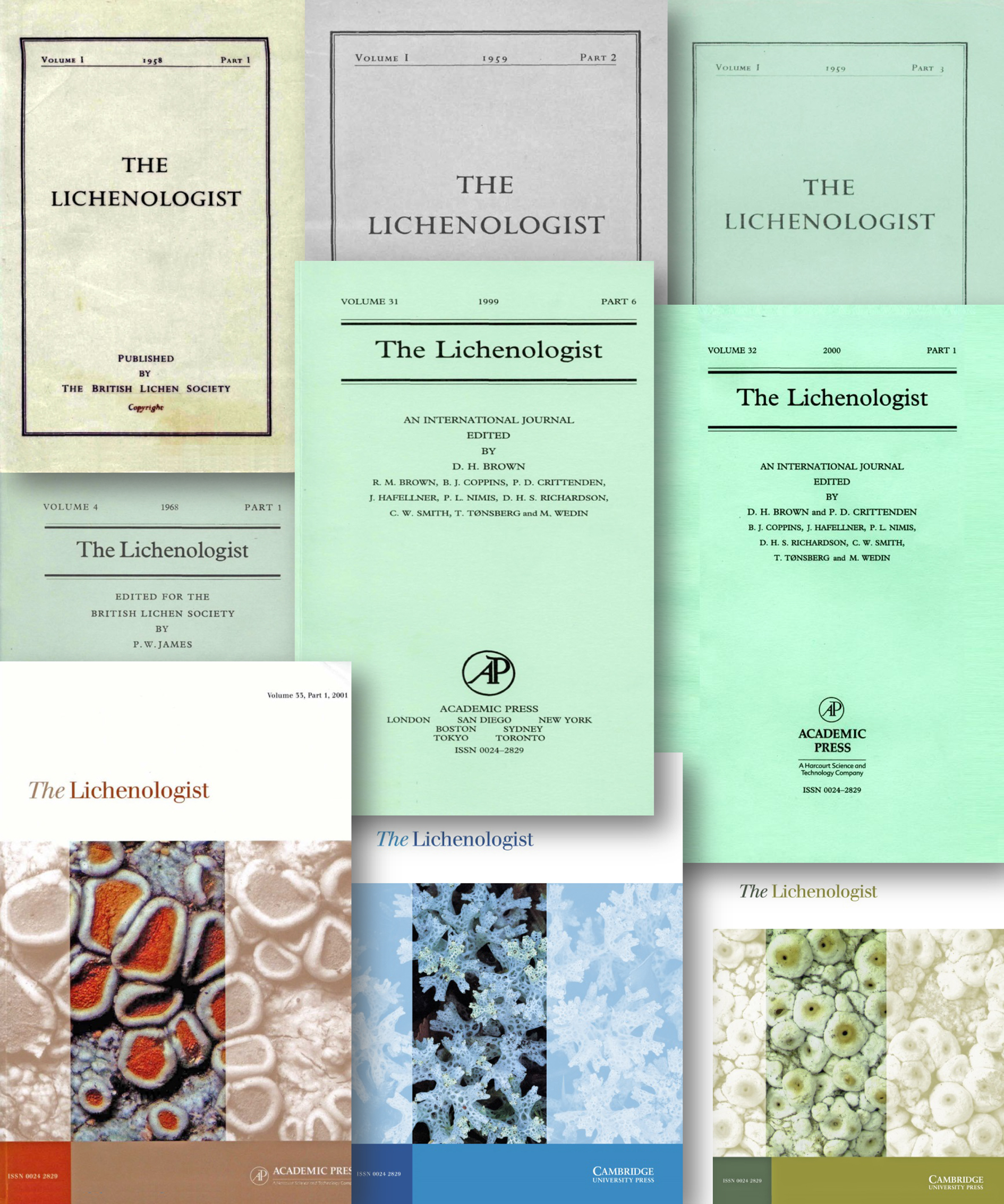
- Discipline: Lichenology
- Language: English
- Edited by: Christopher J. Ellis; Leena Myllys

Publication details
- History: 1958–present
- Publisher: Cambridge University Press on behalf of the British Lichen Society (United Kingdom)
- Frequency: Bimonthly
- Impact factor: 1.6 (2023)

Standard abbreviations
- ISO 4: Lichenologist

Indexing
- ISSN: 0024-2829 (print); 1096-1135 (web)
- LCCN: 83640961
- OCLC no.: 645295326

Links
- Journal homepage; Online access; Online archive

The Lichenologist is a bimonthly peer-reviewed scientific journal specialising in lichenology, including taxonomy, systematics, ecology, biogeography, and conservation. It is published by Cambridge University Press on behalf of the British Lichen Society and the editors-in-chief are Christopher J. Ellis (Royal Botanic Garden Edinburgh) and Leena Myllys (Finnish Museum of Natural History).

== History ==
The journal was established in November 1958. It followed the founding of the British Lichen Society on 1 February 1958. The journal was founded as a publication of the British Lichen Society, with Peter Wilfred James as editor-in-chief. In its early years, the journal was modest in scope, comprising approximately fifty pages annually. The first two volumes were cyclostyled with text typed by Swinscow's secretary.

In its first editorial, the primary objectives of the journal were outlined, which focussed on both the enhancement of lichenological study and the importance of nature conservation. The journal sought to address the scarcity of contemporary literature on British lichen taxonomy by providing detailed articles to assist botanists in identifying local species. Additionally, it aimed to foster contributions on the distribution and ecology of lichens in Britain, areas that were then under-explored. Emphasising the balance between research and the ecological impact of specimen collection, the journal advocated for careful, responsible study practices to avoid harming these slow-growing organisms.

In its early years, the journal experimented with different cover designs before settling on a mint green cover in 1959, which remained in use until 2000. The journal also transitioned from irregularly published volumes to annual volumes, with volume 6 in 1974 marking the start of consecutively numbered volumes synchronised with calendar years. Despite being founded in 1958, the journal reached its fiftieth volume only in 2018, as the early volumes spanned multiple years each.

Over the decades, the journal grew in size, scope, and international significance. For a considerable period, it was the only scientific journal in the world dedicated entirely to lichens, making it an essential publication for research in the field. As it expanded, it became increasingly respected internationally while remaining the flagship publication of the British Lichen Society.

During Crittenden's tenure as senior editor from 2000 to 2019, the journal underwent several significant changes that modernised and enhanced the journal's impact. In 2001, Crittenden initiated a comprehensive overhaul of the journal's layout and printing, introducing a larger page size and a new cover design that departed from the long-standing mint green cover used since 1959. This visual refresh coincided with efforts to broaden the journal's content and appeal.

Crittenden also introduced thematic issues focusing on specific topics within lichenology, which helped to consolidate research in particular areas and increase reader engagement. He also encouraged the submission of longer, more comprehensive papers, allowing for more in-depth treatments of complex subjects. This shift towards more substantial contributions was reflected in an increase in the average number of pages per paper over the years.

Under Crittenden's leadership, the journal also adapted to changes in academic publishing practices and implemented effective electronic publication. In response to evolving nomenclatural requirements, the obligate registration of new fungal names was introduced, ensuring that taxonomic contributions met the latest standards in the field.

Perhaps one of the most notable changes came in 2016 when Crittenden implemented a policy to reject "single naked species descriptions". This decision encouraged authors to contextualise new species descriptions within broader taxonomic or ecological frameworks, thereby increasing the overall impact and usefulness of such contributions. Despite initial concerns, this policy change did not decrease the number of new species described in the journal; instead, it led to more comprehensive taxonomic papers.

== Editors-in-chief ==
The following persons are or have been editors-in-chief:

- Peter W. James (1958–1977)
- David L. Hawksworth (1978–1988)
- Dennis H. Brown (1989–2000)
- Peter Crittenden (2000–2019)
- Christopher J. Ellis and Leena Myllys (2020–present)

== Abstracting and indexing ==
The journal is abstracted and indexed in:

- Biological Abstracts
- BIOSIS Previews
- Current Contents/Agriculture, Biology & Environmental Sciences
- EBSCO databases
- ProQuest databases
- Science Citation Index Expanded
- Scopus

According to the Journal Citation Reports, the journal has a 2023 impact factor of 1.6.
