= David H. S. Richardson =

British and Canadian lichenologist

David Horsfall Stuart Richardson is a British and Canadian lichenologist noted for his studies on the effects of air pollution upon lichens. Richardson was awarded a doctorate from the University of Oxford for his thesis entitled Studies in the biology and physiology of lichens with special reference to Xanthoria parietina (L.) Th. Fr. Richardson was a professor at Trinity College, Dublin, Ireland before transferring to Saint Mary's University, Halifax, Nova Scotia, Canada. Until July 2006, he served as Dean of Science at St. Mary's University for numerous years.

Richardson usually teaches a week-long seminar on lichen identification each summer at the Humboldt Field Research Institute at Eagle Hill along the coast of Maine.

== Honours ==
- Recipient of the George Lawson Medal from the Canadian Botanical Association in 2000.
- Recipient of the Paragon Award in 2003 from the Halifax Ambassador Club. Award and Brief Biography
- Lichen, Skyttea richardsonii named by Teresa Iturriaga and David L. Hawksworth to honor David Richardson.

On line publication Iturriaga, Teresa and David L. Hawksworth. 2004. Skyttea richardsonii sp. nov. from Maine, with a key to the species known from North America. Mycologia 96 (4):925-928.

- Science Atlantic Outstanding Contributing Member, 2015
- Ursula Duncan award by the British Lichen Society (2002) for his contributions to international lichenology
