= Malham Tarn Field Studies Centre =

Field studies centre in North Yorkshire, England

Coordinates: 54.101°N 2.164°W

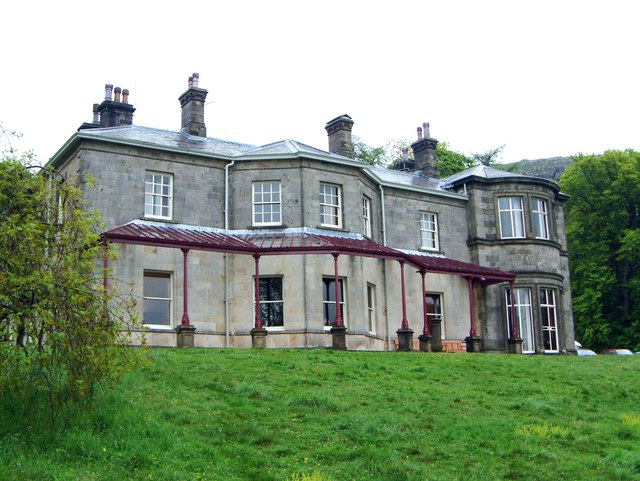
Malham Tarn Field Studies Centre

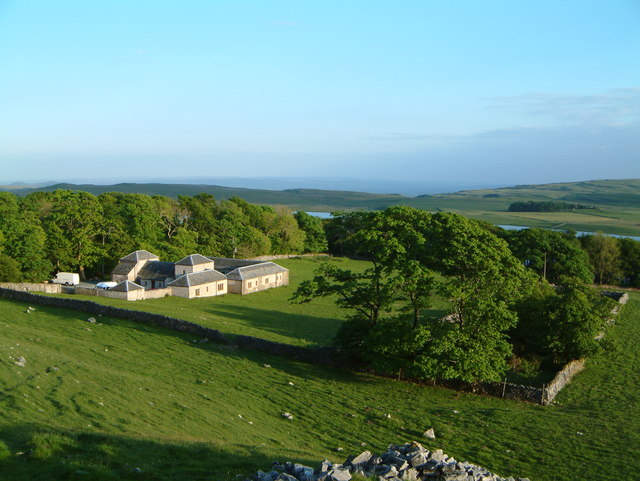
High Stables

FSC Malham Tarn, situated near Malham Tarn in the Yorkshire Dales National Park, North Yorkshire, England, occupies a large Georgian country house, leased from the National Trust. The centre is run by the Field Studies Council and is popular with both geography and biology students, as well as the wider public. Opened in 1947, the Centre celebrated its 60th anniversary in 2007. The centre closed in 2022.

Within walking distance of the Centre are famous limestone features including Malham Cove, Gordale Scar and spectacular karst landscapes. The route of the Pennine Way footpath runs very close to the buildings. Nearby habitats include limestone pavement, grazed and ungrazed grassland, woodland and species-rich fen, acid peat pools and stony hill streams. Malham Tarn itself is one of only eight upland alkaline lakes in Europe.

It was home to Adrian Pickles, a world-expert in the field of inselbergs; he now is working at Preston Montford Field Centre.

The house was built about 1790 for Thomas Lister, Lord Ribblesdale. It was originally known as Malham Water House, and was used as a hunting box. Between 1852 and 1921 it was owned by the Morrison family, and the novelist Charles Kingsley was a visitor. Kingsley was inspired to write The Water-Babies while staying at the house. The house exterior and the surrounding countryside can be seen in the 1951 film Another Man's Poison.

The house was designated in May 1989 as a Grade II listed building.

== Architecture ==
The house, which has been extended, is built of sandstone, with an eaves band, and a hipped grey slate roof. It has two storeys, a main range with fronts of three bays, and a later three-bay east range. On the entrance front is a projecting two-storey porch containing a doorway with a moulded architrave and a cornice on brackets. In the centre of the garden front is a two-storey canted bay window and a verandah. The windows are recessed sashes.

== See also ==
- Listed buildings in Malham Moor
