= British Bryological Society =

British learned society about mosses, liverworts and hornworts

- Formation: 1896
- Type: Learned society
- Headquarters: London
- Location: United Kingdom
- Official language: English
- Website: http://www.britishbryologicalsociety.org.uk/

The British Bryological Society is an academic society dedicated to bryology, which encourages the study of bryophytes (mosses, liverworts and hornworts). It publishes the peer-reviewed Journal of Bryology.

== History ==
The Society developed from the Moss Exchange Club founded in 1896 by Coslett Herbert Waddell who was Secretary of the club until 1903. It was therefore the first bryological society in the world. Its aim was to provide communication between those interested in bryophytes so they could build up collections of correctly identified specimens. The Club produced printed reports and compiled records of bryophyte distributions by vice-county, and members exchanged information by letter, but the Club did not hold meetings. Over the years, several updated lists of the moss flora were produced. Members focused on the British Isles, although several were interested in bryophytes of other countries. A proposal for a formal 'Foreign Section' in 1901 was unsuccessful. In 1903 William Ingham became Secretary and remained in this role until 1921.

Many of the first members had expert knowledge and interest in bryology but relied on employment from other areas to make a living. They included H. N. Dixon, S. M. Macvicar, W. E. Nicholson and Eleonora Armitage as well as Waddell. Few were professional academics. However, members included beginners wanting to learn about bryology, and a section to help them was formed in 1900. The total membership was 37 in 1899 and had reached 100 in 1934. Post-war, there were many academic members and also more from outside the UK, in part due to the development of bryology as a subject for study at university. Membership had increased to 250 in 1950 and was above 500 in the twentyfirst century.

In 1923 the new name British Bryological Society was adopted along with introduction of an annual meeting and field meetings. H.N. Dixon as President and D. A. Jones and Eleonora Armitage as Secretaries. In 1934 members joined from outside the British Isles including Pierre Allorge, Edwin B. Bartram, Alexander W. Evans, Leopold Loeske and N. Malta. In September 1945 the Society celebrated the 50th anniversary of the founding of the Moss Club with a field visit and dinner.

The academic journal Transactions of the British Bryological Society was founded in 1947. E.C. Wallace was secretary 1948 - 1969. Martha Elizabeth Newton was general secretary from 1989 - 1999, having previously been meetings secretary from 1980 until 1988.

== Bryophyte identification and records ==
Identification has been an important interest of the members from the start of the Moss Exchange Club. Field meetings and workshops are held by the Society that allow training in identification skills.

Census Catalogues, of the distribution of bryophytes in the British Isles by vice-county were compiled by the Moss Exchange Club. From 1960 onwards recording has been more detailed and the records have been incorporated into UK atlases and on-line records.

Habitat destruction and atmospheric pollution have major effects on bryophyte distributions, but there have been concerns about the effects of collecting, especially of rarer species. The Society has adopted the BSBI code of conduct for picking, collecting, photographing and enjoying wild bryophytes.

A collection of specimens was built up by the Society, with additions bequeathed by some members. Some of this herbarium were shared or donated in full to the Natural History Museum, London where the herbarium was co-located. From 1946 the Society only added voucher specimens related to distribution records. It consisted of around 21,000 specimens in 1969 and was moved to the National Museum of Wales, Cardiff. Several hundred voucher specimens continued to be added annually, along with some bequests. By 2021 the total was 45,000 specimens.

== Society publications ==
The society regularly publishes Field Bryology (continuation of Bulletin of the British Bryological Society published from 1963 until 2003) aimed at amateur members and those interested in field bryology. It also publishes a scientific journal, Journal of Bryology, with four issues each year to promote the scientific study of bryophytes and understanding of the wider aspects of bryology. This is a continuation of the Transactions of the British Bryological Society and the name was changed in 1972.

It has also published several books. The Field Guide to bryophytes published in 2010 was a practical guide to species in Britain and Ireland.

== Presidents ==
The Moss Exchange Club officials were the Distributor and the Secretary. The Distributors were:

- 1896–1899 Coslett Herbert Waddell
- 1900–1901 J.A. Wheldon
- 1902–1903 T. Barker
- 1904–1905 R.H. Meldrum
- 1906 D.A. Jones
- 1907–1908 E. Cleminshaw
- 1909–1910 H.H. Knight
- 1911–1912 W.H. Burrell
- 1913 Eleonora Armitage
- 1914 D. Lillie
- 1915–1916 P.G. M. Rhodes
- 1917 Eleonora Armitage
- 1918 D. Lillie
- 1919 Eleonora Armitage
- 1920 A. Wilson
- 1921 W.G. Travis
- 1922 Eleonora Armitage

From 1923 the society's name changed to the British Bryological Society. Its presidents have been:

- 1923–1924 H.N. Dixon
- 1925 S.M. Macvicar
- 1926–1928 C.H. Binstead
- 1929–30 W.E. Nicholson
- 1931–1932 W. Watson
- 1933–1934 H.H. Knight
- 1935 D.A. Jones
- 1936 D.A. Jones
- 1937–1938 J.B. Duncan
- 1939–1943 Eleonora Armitage
- 1944–September 1945 E. Armitage
- September 1945–1947 W.R. Sherrin
- 1948–1949 A. Thompson
- 1950–1951 P.W. Richards
- 1952–1953 Lorna I. Scott
- 1954-1955 E.W. Jones
- 1956–1957 L. B.C. Trotter
- 1958–1959 F.A. Sowter
- 1960–1961 Evelyn M. Lobley
- 1962–1963 E. F. Warburg
- 1964–1965 E.V. Watson
- 1966–1967 Joan Appleyard
- 1969-1969 J.H. Peterken
- 1970–1971 A.J. Pettifer
- 1972–1973 E. C. Wallace
- 1974–1975 A.C. Crundwell
- 1976–1977 Jean Paton
- 1978–1979 P.W. Richards
- 1980–1981 S .W. Greene
- 1982–1983 H.L.K. Whitehouse
- 2023-2024 Elizabeth Kungu
