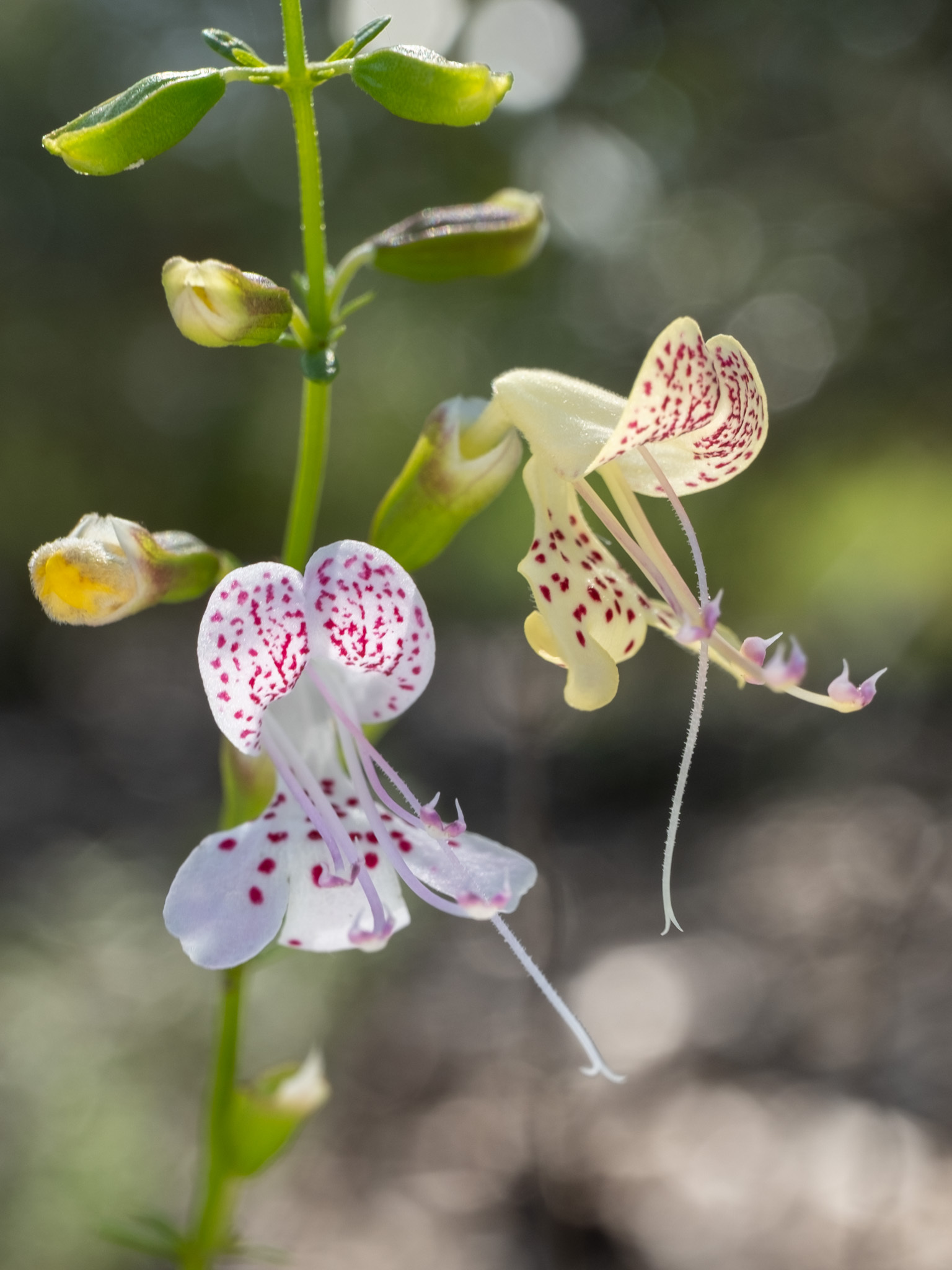

Conservation status
- Critically Imperiled (NatureServe)

Scientific classification
- Kingdom: Plantae
- Clade: Tracheophytes
- Clade: Angiosperms
- Clade: Eudicots
- Clade: Asterids
- Order: Lamiales
- Family: Lamiaceae
- Genus: Dicerandra
- Species: D. modesta

Binomial name
- Dicerandra modesta (Huck) Huck

Synonyms
- Dicerandra frutescens ssp. modesta Huck

= Dicerandra modesta =

Species of plant

Dicerandra modesta is a species of Dicerandra endemic to the Lake Wales Ridge in Central Florida, United States. It is commonly known as blushing scrub balm. It is a listed state and federal endangered species. It is known only from a few populations in Polk County, Florida. It grows in scrub and sand hills.

Dicerandra modesta grows up to 12 in (30 cm) tall. Leaves are oblong to oblanceolate with a minty fragrance. D. modesta was originally described as a subspecies of D. frutescens. It was suggested as a species in 2008 based on molecular phylogenetic data indicating that it was more closely related to D. thinicola and D. immaculata var. immaculata than D. frutescens despite a disjunct distribution and morphological differences.
