= Temporal plasticity =

Temporal plasticity, also known as fine-grained environmental adaptation, is a type of phenotypic plasticity that involves the phenotypic change of organisms in response to changes in the environment over time. Animals can respond to short-term environmental changes with physiological (reversible) and behavioral changes; plants, which are sedentary, respond to short-term environmental changes with both physiological and developmental (non-reversible) changes. However, the temporal dynamics of phenotypic plasticity are more complex that initially thought, with some organisms exhibiting both reversible and irreversible changes for the same trait during their lifespan. The temporal component of plastic responses itself might also vary among species due to evolutionary divergence, thus suggesting a genetic basis for this trait.

Temporal plasticity takes place over a time scale of minutes, days, or seasons, and in environments that are both variable and predictable within the lifespan of an individual. Temporal plasticity is considered adaptive if the phenotypic response results in increased fitness. Non-reversible phenotypic changes can be observed in metameric organisms such as plants that depend on the environmental condition(s) each metamer was developed under. Under some circumstances early exposure to specific stressors can affect how an individual plant is capable of responding to future environmental changes (Metaplasticity).

== Reversible plasticity ==
A reversible change is defined as one that is expressed in response to an environmental stressor but returns to a normal state after the stress is no longer present. Reversible changes are more likely to be adaptive for an organism when the stress driving the change is temporary and the organism is likely to be exposed to it again within its lifetime. Reversible plasticity often involves changes in physiology or behavior. Perennial plants, which often experience recurring stresses in their environment due to lack of mobility, benefit greatly from reversible physiological plasticity such as changes in resource uptake and allocation. When essential nutrients are low, root and leaf resorption rates can increase, persisting at a high rate until there are more nutrients available in the soil and resorption rates can return to their normal state.

== Irreversible plasticity ==
Irreversible changes are described as changes that remain expressed in an organism after the environmental stress has ceased. Environmental shifts that drive irreversible plasticity in an organism tend to be less rapidly changing, such as gradually increasing temperatures. This often leads to permanent changes in morphology or in the developmental process of an organism (developmental plasticity). Plants are highly plastic and tend to express many irreversible developmental changes, such as shifts in timing of bud and flower development. In animals, many organisms benefit from having multiple persisting morphs in a population that arise during development in response to environmental conditions. For example, freshwater snails will form more spherical shells when in the presence of a predator (bluegill sunfish) and conical shells when predators are absent. These shell shapes are permanent and cannot be reverted, even if the predator status of the snail's environment changes.

== Examples ==
Morphologically and developmentally plastic traits can be reversible in some cases, and there are some physiological responses which can be irreversible, which differs from the typical trend. One example of developmental plasticity that is reversible is the shift in mouth form of roundworm, Pristionchus pacificus, when exposed to a changes in food type and availability. A second example of reversible developmental plasticity is the length of Galapagos marine iguanas, Amblyrhynchus cristatus, in response to El Niño weather conditions. During El Niño seasons, the algal food supply decreases, but increases during La Niña seasons. This change in food availability coincides with the changes in iguana size during the season.

A unique and complex example of plasticity is camouflage, an adaption that allows animals to avoid predators by hiding in plain sight. The mechanisms behind camouflage are not the same in all species - they can be morphological, physiological, behavioral, or even a combination of traits. Camouflage can also be irreversible or reversible, depending on the species. Camouflage can be irreversible when color patterns or other morphological traits are set during development. However, camouflage can also be reversible, with color, texture, and behavioral changes occurring in response to immediate threats (e.g., Mimic octopus).

In some cases, the exact same change in phenotype can be reversible in one species and irreversible in another. For example, both pea and wheat plants express changes in root growth due to environmental cues, but the changes are permanent only for wheat. Sometimes this can even occur within the same species, due to the largely unpredictable results of interactions between an individual's genetic make-up and their specific environmental experiences.

=== Leaf development ===
Dicerandra linearifolia leaves grown at the beginning of its development, with lower ambient temperature, are thicker, wider, and possess less stomata than those grown later in the same year.

Leaf structure in plants is often affected by high light and low light conditions. After being exposed to varying levels of light, Aechmea aquilega, underwent significant changes in the development of its leaf characteristics. In heavy light exposure, the leaves of the plant were observed to be smaller and more rigid than those in low light conditions.

=== Root density ===
In times of sporadic nutrient availability, fine root density increases in order to more efficiently absorb nutrients. In times of water inundation, plants will increase root mass in response to make use of the excess water in the environment.

=== Nutrient resorption ===
Plants are capable of adjusting the degree nutrients are reabsorbed from their leaves. Resorption tends to be incomplete in nutrient-rich environments, and conversely nutrient poor environments often trigger complete resorption in plants.

=== Leaf morphology ===
Leaves grown during the dry season differ from those grown in wetter seasons. The leaves differ in their shape (leaves grown during the dry season were longer and narrower in comparison to those grown during the wet season), possessed higher trichome density, and lower anthocyanin levels.
