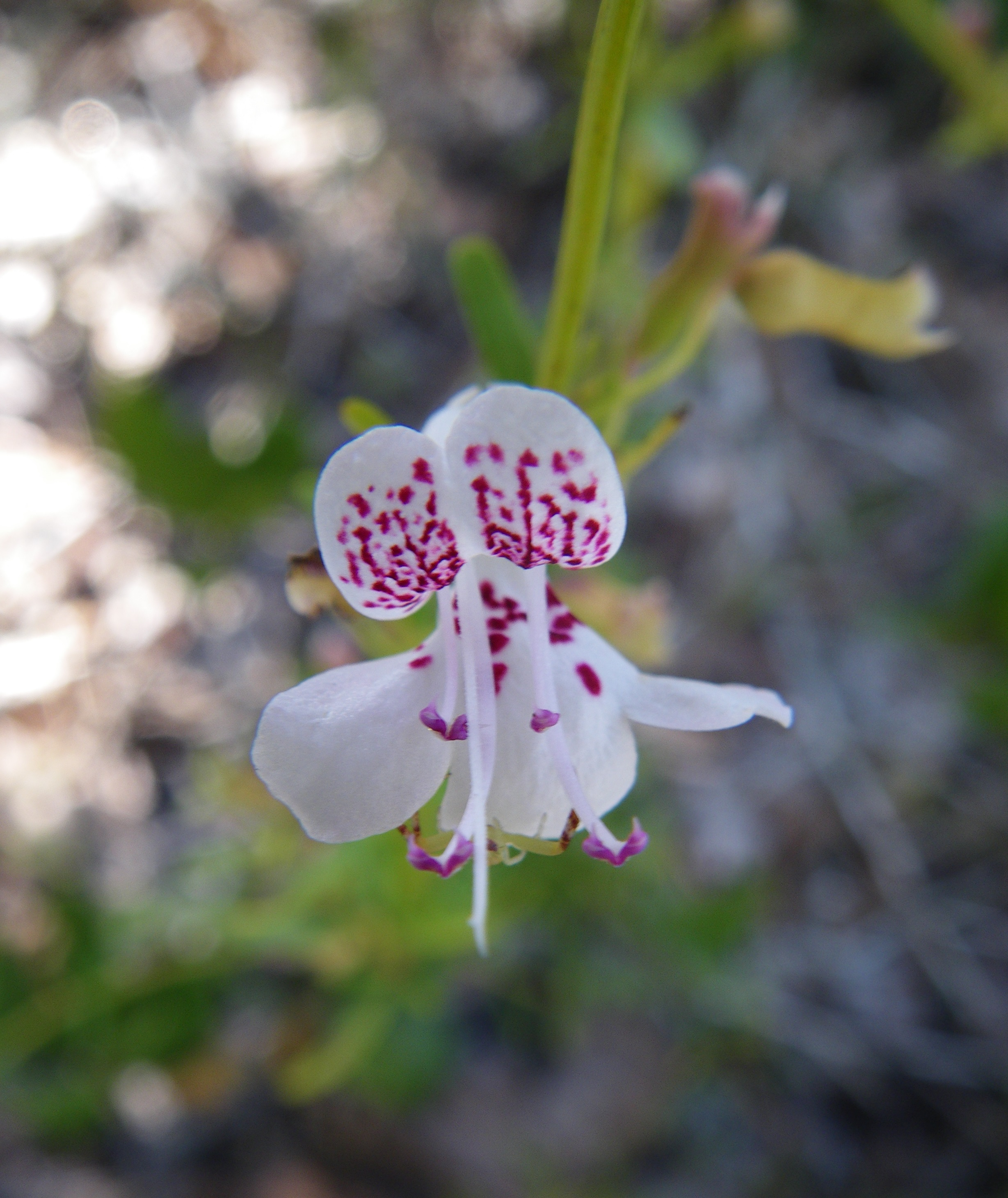

Conservation status
- Critically Imperiled (NatureServe)

- Endangered (ESA)

Scientific classification
- Kingdom: Plantae
- Clade: Tracheophytes
- Clade: Angiosperms
- Clade: Eudicots
- Clade: Asterids
- Order: Lamiales
- Family: Lamiaceae
- Genus: Dicerandra
- Species: D. frutescens

Binomial name
- Dicerandra frutescens Shinners 1962

= Dicerandra frutescens =

Species of plant

Dicerandra frutescens is a rare species of flowering plant in the mint family known by the common names scrub mint and scrub balm. It is endemic to Highlands County, Florida, where it is known only from the Lake Wales Ridge. Its habitat is quickly being lost as it is converted to residential and agricultural use. It was federally listed as an endangered species of the United States in 1985.

This shrub grows about half a meter tall from a deep taproot. It is glandular and strongly aromatic with a mint scent. The oblong leaves are roughly 2 centimeters long, smooth-edged, oppositely arranged, and dotted with visible oil glands. The inflorescence is a pair of flowers each roughly 1.5 centimeters long. The flower has a tubular throat and a lobed, lipped mouth. The corolla is white to light pink and dotted with darker pink on the lips. The protruding stamens are tipped with tiny horned anthers. Blooming occurs in August through October. The flowers are pollinated by the bee-fly Exprosopa fasciata.

A number of other Dicerandra have been separated from D. frutescens and elevated to species status, including Dicerandra cornutissima in 1981, Dicerandra christmanii in 1989, and Dicerandra modesta in 2008.

This plant grows in endangered Florida scrub habitat on the botanically unique Lake Wales Ridge. It is estimated that 74.4% of the native habitat in this area was destroyed or altered by 1981, and the process continues today. There are fourteen occurrences, and nine of them are located on private property that may be slated for development; their status is uncertain and some of them may have been destroyed. The scrub where the plant grows is yellow sand scrub dominated by either sand pine or a mix of oaks (Quercus spp.) and scrub hickory (Carya floridana), or both types. This kind of habitat is maintained by periodic wildfire, a process which is required to clear large and woody vegetation and provide gaps that the smaller plants, including this species, require. Fire suppression is a threat to these species.

There is little damage from disease or predation on the plants, but one species of moth does use it as a larval host. The larva of Pyrausta panopealis is not disturbed by the aromatic oils that keep most other insects from consuming the plant. Furthermore, the moth larva might protect itself from other insects by vomiting quantities of the irritating oil all over itself.
