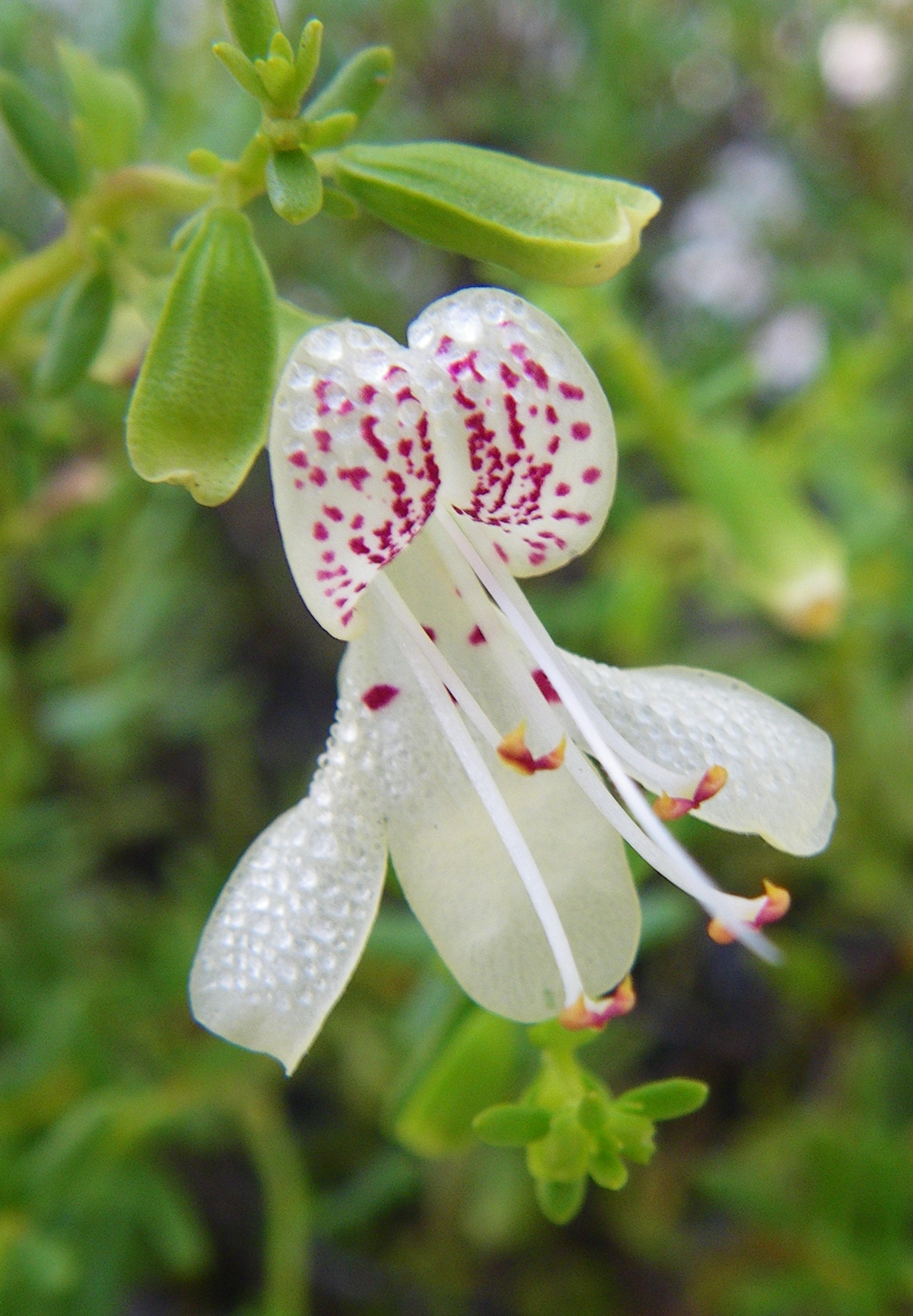

Conservation status
- Critically Imperiled (NatureServe)

- Endangered (ESA)

Scientific classification
- Kingdom: Plantae
- Clade: Tracheophytes
- Clade: Angiosperms
- Clade: Eudicots
- Clade: Asterids
- Order: Lamiales
- Family: Lamiaceae
- Genus: Dicerandra
- Species: D. christmanii

Binomial name
- Dicerandra christmanii R.B.Huck & W.S.Judd

= Dicerandra christmanii =

Species of flowering plant

Dicerandra christmanii is a rare species of flowering plant in the mint family known by the common names Garrett's mint, yellow scrub balm, and Lake Wales balm. It is endemic to Highlands County, Florida, in the United States, where it is known from only four sites on the Lake Wales Ridge. All are contained within a tract of land measuring 6 kilometers by 3 kilometers. The plant is steadily declining due to the destruction and degradation of its habitat, and only one of the four occurrences is on protected land. It is a federally listed endangered species.

The plant was first collected in 1948 by Ray Garrett. Over the years it was included within the description of its close relative, Dicerandra frutescens. In 1989 it was reexamined and named as a new species on the basis of the color of its anthers, its scent and certain related chemical compounds in the herbage, and the length of its leaves. D. christmanii has white or cream-colored flowers with yellow anthers, a menthol scent, and shorter leaves, while D. frutescens has cream flowers that fade to white, and purple or white anthers. The two are otherwise quite similar in appearance. D. christmanii is an aromatic shrub growing up to 1.3 feet tall. The squared, ridged stem and oppositely arranged leaves have many oil glands. Blooming occurs in summer and fall. Flowers occur singly or in whorls of three. Each is white to cream in color with purple spotting on the lobed lips. The yellow-anthered stamens protrude from the mouth of the corolla and bear white pollen. The anthers have spurs that trigger the release of pollen, a trait common to genus Dicerandra. The plant is pollinated most often by Exprosopa fasciata, a species of bee-fly.

This plant is one of many that is found only on Lake Wales Ridge, an area of very high endemism. The habitat is yellow-sand Florida scrub dominated by sand pines (Pinus clausa), several species of oak, and scrub hickory (Carya floridana). It does not occur together with D. frutescens, but slightly to the north of its relative. The habitat is highly fragmented, with land in the area converted to citrus groves. Remaining parts are degraded, the wildfire-adapted habitat having been overgrown with dense vegetation in an era of fire suppression. The mint only grows in open areas in the canopy, space which is rare today as the larger and woody vegetation succeeds. Fire is also required to clear out leaf litter in the understory. Furthermore, plants of this species in open habitat are more likely to be visited by pollinators than plants under overgrown canopy.

Besides outright habitat loss and lack of a natural fire regime, threats to the species include drought and the invasive weed cogon grass (Imperata cylindrica). The plant has a limited ability to disperse its seeds, and this is reduced more by the fragmentation of the habitat. Off-road vehicles and trash dumping may affect the area.

Because D. frutescens was already on the endangered species list, D. christmanii was given that status when it was separated and named a new species. It is considered "one of the most critically endangered plant species on the Lake Wales Ridge," among many endangered species.
