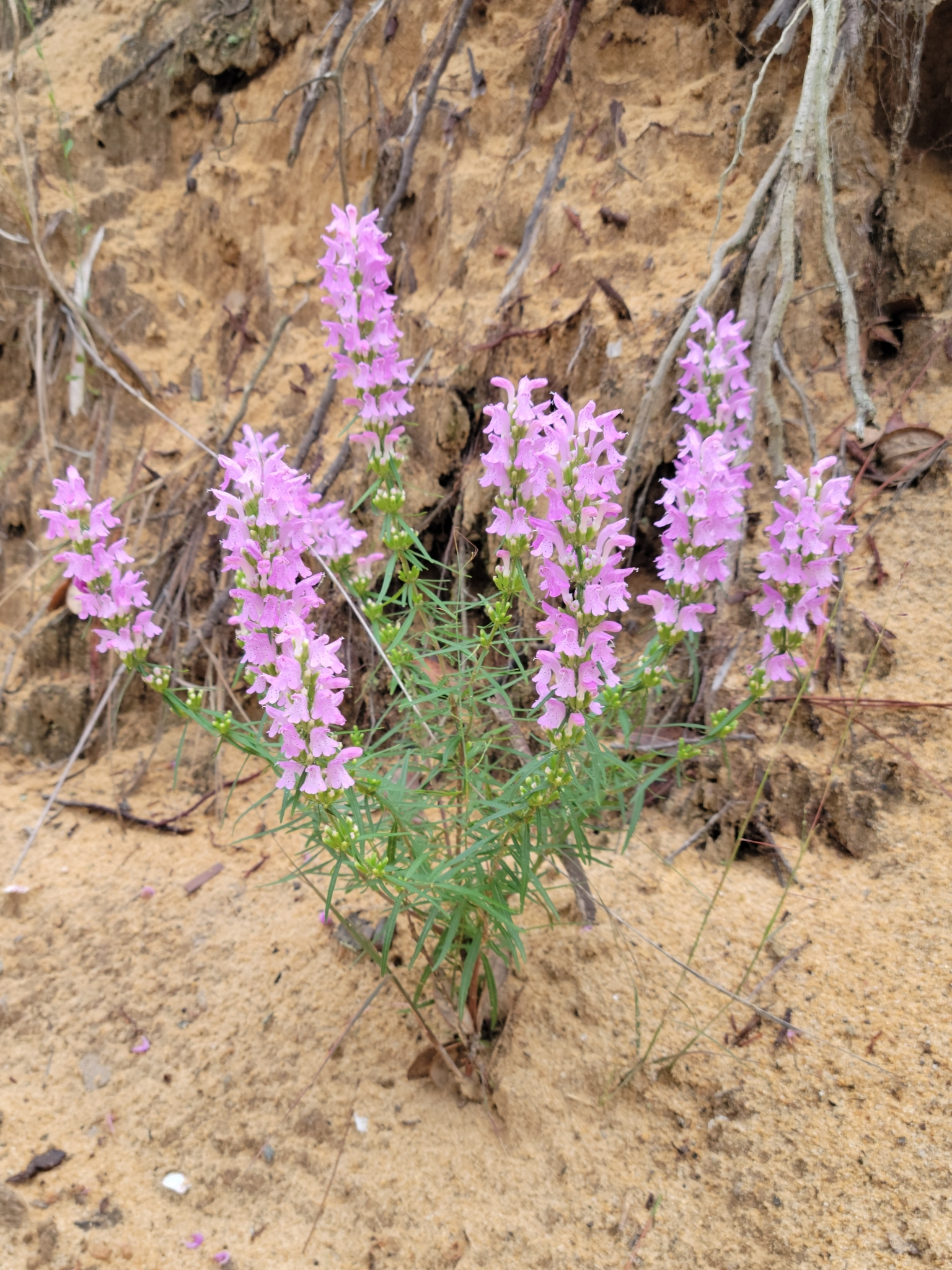

Conservation status
- Apparently Secure (NatureServe)

Scientific classification
- Kingdom: Plantae
- Clade: Tracheophytes
- Clade: Angiosperms
- Clade: Eudicots
- Clade: Asterids
- Order: Lamiales
- Family: Lamiaceae
- Genus: Dicerandra
- Species: D. odoratissima

Binomial name
- Dicerandra odoratissima R.M. Hopper

= Dicerandra odoratissima =

Species of flowering plant

Dicerandra odoratissima, commonly known as the rose balm or Harper's scrub balm, is a species of Dicerandra native to the Southeastern Coastal Plain, with a geographic range that extends from eastern Georgia to southern South Carolina. Kral (1982) originally suggested that this species was so distinct from the remaining members of the genus that it should be placed in a separate section or a distinct genus. Today, D. odoratissima and its close relative D. radfordiana are members of the Lecontea clade.
