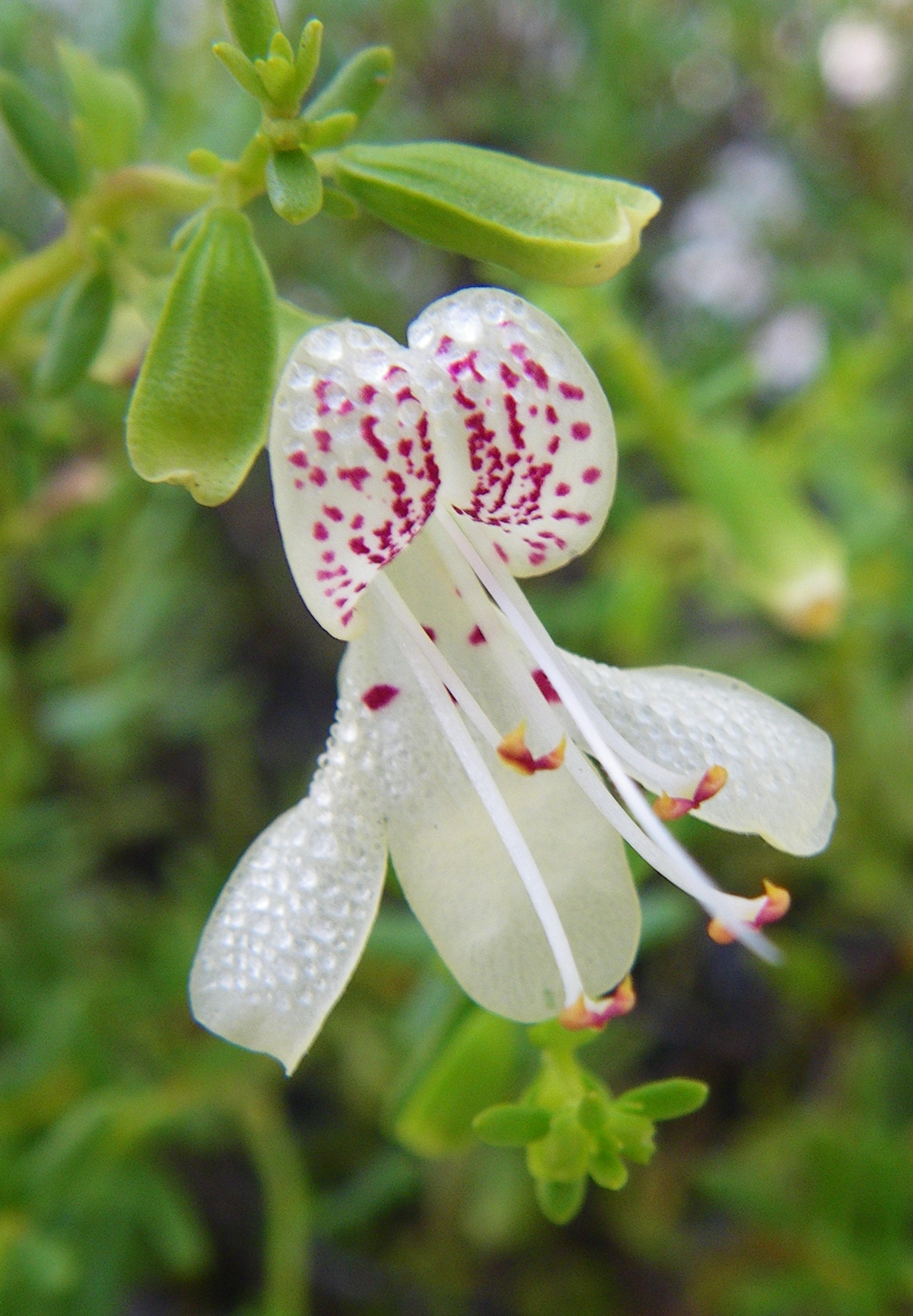
- Dicerandra christmanii

Scientific classification
- Kingdom: Plantae
- Clade: Tracheophytes
- Clade: Angiosperms
- Clade: Eudicots
- Clade: Asterids
- Order: Lamiales
- Family: Lamiaceae
- Subfamily: Nepetoideae
- Tribe: Mentheae
- Genus: Dicerandra; Benth

Synonyms
- Ceranthera Elliott 1821 not P. Beauv. 1808 nor Raf. 1819

= Dicerandra =

Genus of flowering plants

Dicerandra is a genus of flowering plants in the mint family. Dicerandra comprises 11 species: six perennial and five annual species. The perennials have narrow ranges in Central Florida with small population sizes and only occur on ancient dune ridges along the Lake Wales Ridge or the Atlantic Coastal Ridge; the annual species occur more broadly on sandhill habitats to the north. The perennials’ habitat has been severely fragmented due to human development over the past century. As a result, all perennial species except one are listed as federally endangered. Annual species of the clade have large ranges when compared to perennial members, with distributions of annuals ranging for hundreds of miles from the Panhandle of Florida to southeastern Georgia, with the exception of Dicerandra radfordiana which is endemic to two sites along the Altamaha river. The genus is characterized by hornlike spurs on their anthers.

The phylogenetics of this genus have been studied before; first by Robin Huck in 1987, who described Section Dicerandra, which includes all species with standard-lobed corollas and exserted stamens, and section Lecontea which includes D. odoratissima and D. radfordiana that have cucullate-lobed corolla species with inserted stamens. Subsequent studies by plant systematists at the University of Florida have confirmed these sections, in addition to discovering a potential chloroplast capture event in Dicerandra immaculata var. savannarum.

== Ecology ==
Dicerandra species are found along ancient sand-hill habitats in the southeastern US. Northern, annual taxa occur mostly on acidic white sand that are remnants of ancient shorelines during the Pleistocene. Southern perennials either occur on red sands along the Lake Wales Ridge or on white sands along the Atlantic coast. They prefer open habitats free from tree cover and rapidly draining soils. Some, like Dicerandra cornutissima, have been reported along Interstate 75 where frequent machine clearing have provided a suitable habitat.

== Species ==
1. Dicerandra christmanii Huck & Judd = Dicerandra frutescens var. christmanii (Huck & Judd) D.B.Ward
2. Dicerandra cornutissima Huck = Dicerandra frutescens var. cornutissima (Huck) D.B.Ward
3. Dicerandra densiflora Benth. - northern Florida
4. Dicerandra frutescens Shinners - scrub mint - central Florida
5. Dicerandra fumella Huck - Florida panhandle, southern Alabama
6. Dicerandra immaculata Lakela - Lakela's mint = Dicerandra frutescens var. immaculata (Lakela) D.B.Ward
7. Dicerandra linearifolia (Elliott) Benth. - coastal plain mint - southern Georgia, southern Alabama, northern Florida
8. Dicerandra modesta (Huck) Huck = Dicerandra frutescens subsp. modesta Huck
9. Dicerandra odoratissima R.M.Harper - rose balm - southern South Carolina, southeastern Georgia
10. Dicerandra radfordiana Huck - Radford's balm - McIntosh County in Georgia
11. Dicerandra thinicola H.A.Mill - Titusville mint = Dicerandra frutescens subsp. thinicola (H.A.Mill.) D.B.Ward
