= Pristimantis mutabilis =

Conservation status
- Endangered (IUCN 3.1)

Scientific classification
- Kingdom: Animalia
- Phylum: Chordata
- Class: Amphibia
- Order: Anura
- Family: Strabomantidae
- Genus: Pristimantis
- Species: P. mutabilis

Binomial name
- Pristimantis mutabilis Guayasamin, Krynak, Krynak, Culebras, and Hutter, 2015

Species of frog

Pristimantis mutabilis, also known as the mutable rainfrog or "punk rock" rainfrog, is a species of frog in the family Strabomantidae. It is found in the Ecuadoran Andes of Pichincha and Imbabura provinces. Pristimantis mutabilis is the first known amphibian species that is able to change skin texture from tuberculate to almost smooth in a few minutes, an extreme example of phenotypic plasticity. The specific epithet mutabilis (changeable) refers to this ability. The physiological mechanism behind the skin texture change remains unknown.

== Taxonomy and discovery ==
Pristimantis mutabilis was formally described in 2015 in the Zoological Journal of the Linnean Society. The holotype had been collected in 2013. The species was placed in the genus Pristimantis on the basis of genetic studies supported by morphological analysis. The new species was first spotted in 2006, but the first specimen was not collected until 2009, at which time its unusual ability was discovered.

Also Pristimantis sobetes, a related species but from a different species group, has been found to display similar skin texture plasticity, suggesting that this trait may be more common in Pristimantis than in other amphibians. Pristimantis mutabilis is able to use its rapid changes in skin texture as an advantage for its safety, to stay camouflaged and thereby avoid predators. (https://doi.org/10.1111/zoj.12222)

== Description ==
Males of Pristimantis mutabilis measure about 17 mm (0.67 in) and females 21–23 mm (0.83–0.91 in) in snout-to-vent length (SVL). In life, males have a light brown to pale greyish green dorsum, with bright green marks and grey to dark brown chevrons, outlined by thin cream or white lines, with orange dorsolateral folds. The belly is pale grey to brown with darker diffuse spots, and few small white spots. Females have red flash coloration.

== Habitat and conservation ==
The habitat of Pristimantis mutabilis is arboreal, and it is known from both primary and secondary Andean forests at elevations of 1,850–2,063 m (6,070–6,768 ft) above sea level.

P. mutabilis is only known from three sites in two separate reserves. Based on the vocalizations during the night, it is abundant, but it is difficult to see because of its arboreal habits. However, the known subpopulations are separated by a dispersal barrier (the dry valley of the Guayllabamba River), and the general area is suffering from habitat destruction and fragmentation. Chytridiomycosis may also be a threat.
