= Ancylocera cardinalis =

Scientific classification
- Domain: Eukaryota
- Kingdom: Animalia
- Phylum: Arthropoda
- Class: Insecta
- Order: Coleoptera
- Suborder: Polyphaga
- Infraorder: Cucujiformia
- Family: Cerambycidae
- Genus: Ancylocera
- Species: A. cardinalis

Binomial name
- Ancylocera cardinalis Dalman, 1823

Species of beetle

Ancylocera cardinalis is a species of beetle in the family Cerambycidae. It was described by Johan Wilhelm Dalman in 1823.
