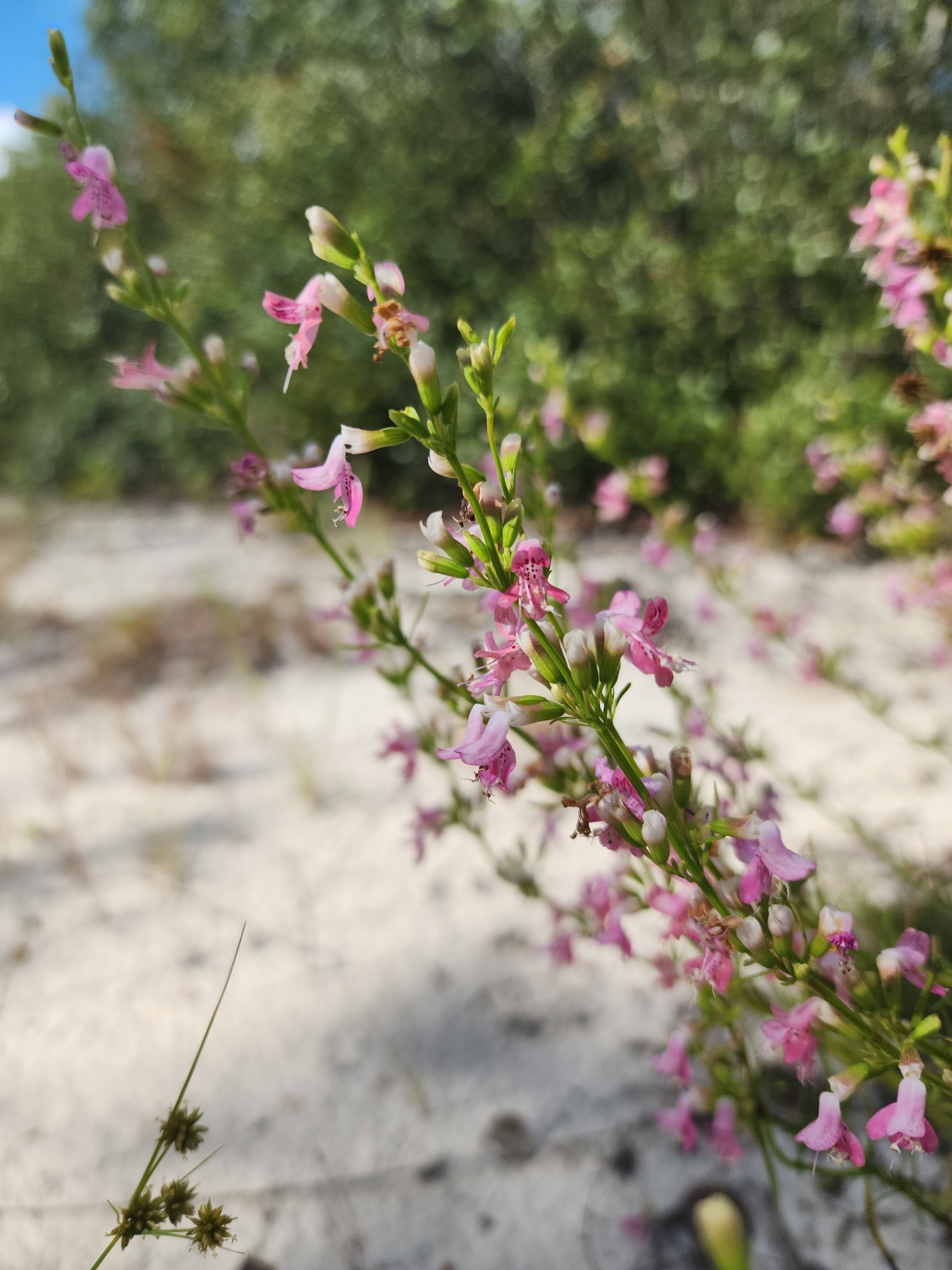

Conservation status
- Imperiled (NatureServe)

- Endangered (ESA)

Scientific classification
- Kingdom: Plantae
- Clade: Tracheophytes
- Clade: Angiosperms
- Clade: Eudicots
- Clade: Asterids
- Order: Lamiales
- Family: Lamiaceae
- Genus: Dicerandra
- Species: D. cornutissima

Binomial name
- Dicerandra cornutissima R.B.Huck

= Dicerandra cornutissima =

Species of flowering plant

Dicerandra cornutissima is a rare species of flowering plant in the mint family known by the common names longspurred mint, longspurred balm, and Robin's mint. It is endemic to Florida in the United States. It is found in Marion County, and possibly Sumter County, but it may have been totally extirpated from the latter. There are 12 known occurrences remaining as of 2017, down from 15 in 2000. The plant was federally listed as an endangered species in 1985.

This species was formerly included within the description of its relative, Dicerandra frutescens. It was separated, elevated to species status, and described by Robin B. Huck in 1981. The new species is distinguished from D. frutescens in its darker, deeper pink flowers, its larger anthers, the smaller amount of hairs on its style, and its relatively narrow leaves. It has a geographically separated distribution further north from that of D. frutescens.

This is a strong-scented aromatic shrub growing up to about half a meter tall. The erect stems grow from a woody base. The oppositely arranged leaves are linear in shape, 1.5 centimeters long, smooth-edged, and dotted with visible oil glands. The flower has a corolla just under a centimeter long with a bent, tubular throat and lobed lips. The corolla is dark pink or purplish with purple spotting and a paler throat. The anthers have hornlike spurs, which, at over a millimeter long, are relatively large.

The plant grows in Florida scrub habitat and nearby sandhills. The scrub is dominated by stands of sand pines and several species of oak. Species in the understory include saw palmetto (Serenoa repens), scrub palmetto (Sabal etonia), and Florida rosemary (Ceratiola ericoides). The sandy ground may be covered with various lichens, such as Cladonia evansii, Cladonia subtenuis, and Cladonia leporina, and grass species such as wiregrass (Aristida stricta) and arrowfeather threeawn (A. purpurascens).

The loss of this Florida scrub habitat is the greatest threat to the survival of this species. Six of the fifteen remaining occurrences are in protected areas. Land is lost to urban development. The remaining territory is degraded because of the lack of proper land management. Although fire in the area is rare, it is required in this fire-adapted habitat type to maintain the ecosystem. Periodic fire clears out overgrown vegetation and creates the openings in the pine and oak canopy that this and many other species require. Controlled burns would be beneficial but these are difficult in this region because of nearby residential neighborhoods. Fires that start naturally are extinguished. Other threats to the plant include introduced plant species such as Natal grass (Rhynchelytrum repens).
