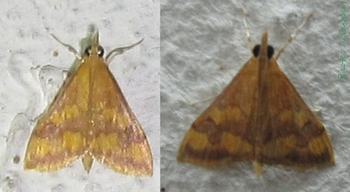

Scientific classification
- Kingdom: Animalia
- Phylum: Arthropoda
- Clade: Pancrustacea
- Class: Insecta
- Order: Lepidoptera
- Family: Crambidae
- Genus: Pyrausta
- Species: P. phoenicealis

Binomial name
- Pyrausta phoenicealis (Hübner, 1818)

Synonyms
- Haematia phoenicealis Hübner, 1818; Botys phaenicealis Snellen, 1883; Botys phaenicialis Snellen, 1875; Rhodaria flegialis Walker, 1859; Rhodaria noraxalis Walker, 1859; Pyrausta chrysocarpa Meyrick, 1937; Botys coecilialis Walker, 1859; Myriostephes heliamma Meyrick, 1885; Rhodaria catenalis Walker, 1866; Rhodaria juncturalis Walker, 1866; Rhodaria ocellusalis Walker, 1859; Rhodaria panopealis Walker, 1859; Rhodaria probalis Walker, 1859; Pyrausta panopealis (Walker, 1859); Rhodaria panopealis Walker, 1859; Pyrausta nerialis Boisduval, 1833

= Pyrausta phoenicealis =

Species of moth

Pyrausta phoenicealis, the perilla leaf moth, is a moth of the family Crambidae described by Jacob Hübner in 1818. It is found worldwide, including the Americas, Africa, Australia and Asia.

It is a pest of Perilla (shiso), fruit mint (Dicerandra frutescens ) and knobweed (Hyptis capitata). Larvae also feed on Lamiaceae mint plants, such as Hyptis pectina, Coleus species and rosemary.
