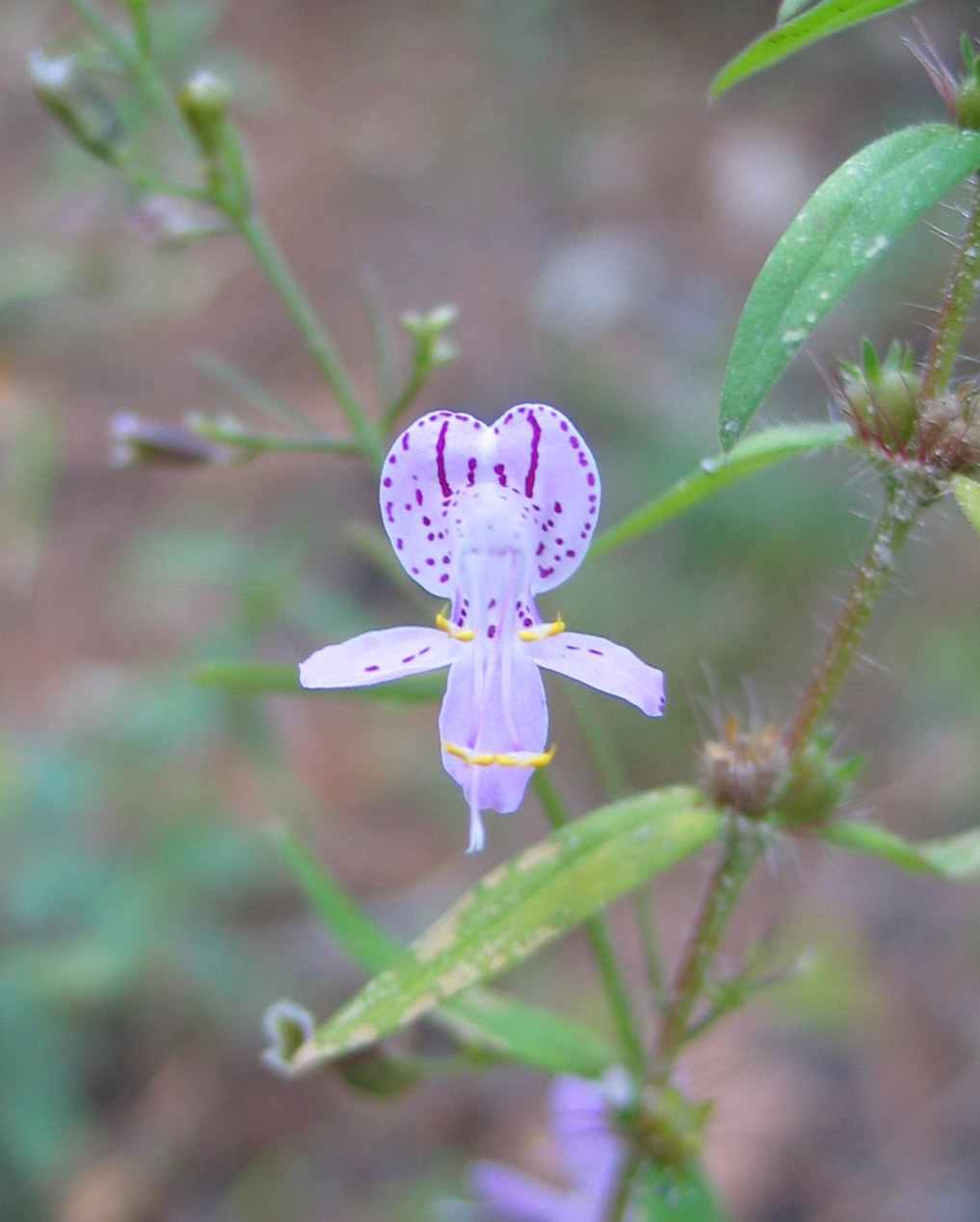

Scientific classification
- Kingdom: Plantae
- Clade: Tracheophytes
- Clade: Angiosperms
- Clade: Eudicots
- Clade: Asterids
- Order: Lamiales
- Family: Lamiaceae
- Genus: Dicerandra
- Species: D. fumella

Binomial name
- Dicerandra fumella Huck

= Dicerandra fumella =

Species of flowering plant

Dicerandra fumella, commonly known as smoky balm or Alabama balm, is an aromatic herbaceous perennial plant species in the mint family (Lamiaceae).

== Description ==
The leaves are narrow, typically 1–3 mm wide (sometimes up to 5 mm), and are usually rolled under along the margins. The inflorescences may be either simple or branched, and each cyme generally bears three to five flowers (occasionally seven). The corolla tube measures 6–7 mm in length and extends visibly beyond the calyx. The limb of the corolla is funnel-shaped, with the upright lobe noticeably taller than it is wide.

== Distribution ==
Dicentra fumella is endemic to a limited number of sandy habitats in the Florida Panhandle and southern Alabama. A hybrid zone between Dicerandra fumella and Dicerandra linearifolia var. robustior is located in the Marianna Lowland, west of the Apalachicola River in Florida.

== Taxonomy ==
Dicerandra fumella was formerly treated as a variety of Dicerandra linearifolia.
