= Ancylocera =

Scientific classification
- Domain: Eukaryota
- Kingdom: Animalia
- Phylum: Arthropoda
- Class: Insecta
- Order: Coleoptera
- Suborder: Polyphaga
- Infraorder: Cucujiformia
- Family: Cerambycidae
- Subfamily: Cerambycinae
- Tribe: Trachyderini
- Genus: Ancylocera; Audinet-Serville, 1834

Genus of beetles

Ancylocera is a genus of beetles in the family Cerambycidae, containing the following species:

- Ancylocera amplicornis Chemsak, 1963
- Ancylocera bicolor (Olivier, 1795)
- Ancylocera bruchi Viana, 1971
- Ancylocera cardinalis (Dalman, 1823)
- Ancylocera michelbacheri Chemsak, 1963
- Ancylocera nigella Gounelle, 1913
- Ancylocera sallei Buquet, 1857
- Ancylocera sergioi Monné & Napp, 2001
- Ancylocera spinula Monné & Napp, 2001
