= Ancylocera sallei =

Scientific classification
- Domain: Eukaryota
- Kingdom: Animalia
- Phylum: Arthropoda
- Class: Insecta
- Order: Coleoptera
- Suborder: Polyphaga
- Infraorder: Cucujiformia
- Family: Cerambycidae
- Genus: Ancylocera
- Species: A. sallei

Binomial name
- Ancylocera sallei Bucquet, 1857

Species of beetle

Ancylocera sallei is a species of beetle in the family Cerambycidae and was described by Bucquet in 1857.
