= Beneficial acclimation hypothesis =

Physiological hypothesis

The beneficial acclimation hypothesis (BAH) is the physiological hypothesis that acclimating to a particular environment (usually thermal) provides an organism with advantages in that environment. First formally tested by Armand Marie Leroi, Albert Bennett, and Richard Lenski in 1994, it has however been a central assumption in historical physiological work that acclimation is adaptive. Further refined by Raymond B. Huey and David Berrigan under the strong inference approach, the hypothesis has been falsified as a general rule by a series of multiple hypotheses experiments.

== History and definition ==
Acclimation is a set of physiological responses that occurs during an individual's lifetime to chronic laboratory-induced environmental conditions (in contrast to acclimatization). It is one component of adaptation. While physiologists have traditionally assumed that acclimation is beneficial (or explicitly defined it as such), criticism of the adaptationist program by Stephen Jay Gould and Richard Lewontin led to a call for increased robustness in testing adaptationist hypotheses.

The initial definition of the BAH, as published in 1994 in the Proceedings of the National Academy of Sciences by Leroi et al., is that

"acclimation to a particular environment gives an organism a performance advantage in that environment over another organism that has not had the opportunity to acclimate to that particular environment."

This definition was further reworked in an article in American Zoologist 1999 by Raymond B. Huey, David Berrigan, George W. Gilchrist, and Jon C. Herron. They determined that, following Platt's strong inference approach, multiple competing hypotheses were needed to properly assess beneficial acclimation. These included:

1. Beneficial Acclimation. Acclimating to a particular environment confers fitness advantages in that environment.

2. Optimal Developmental Temperature. There is an ideal temperature to develop at so individuals reared at an optimal temperature compete better in all environments.

3. Colder (bigger) Is Better. In ectotherms, individuals reared in colder environments tend to develop to a larger body size. These individuals therefore have a fitness advantage in all environments.

4. Warmer (smaller) Is Better. The inverse of Colder Is Better. Smaller individuals have a fitness advantage.

5. Developmental Buffering. Development temperature does not affect adult fitness.

== Experimental tests ==
The majority of tests of the beneficial adaptation hypothesis have, following Krogh's principle, centered on the model organisms Drosophila melanogaster and Escherichia coli. More specifically, experimental tests have centered on easily measured temperature adaptation (although other systems have been studied; see). Of the several experimental tests of the beneficial acclimation hypothesis, most have rejected it as a universal rule (see reviews).

Initial experiments by Leroi et al., the first scientists to address this problem, tested only the beneficial acclimation hypothesis and not the subsequent hypotheses developed by Huey et al. Colonies of E. coli were acclimated for seven generations in two different temperature conditions: 32 °C and 41.5 °C. Colonies were then competed against each other at those temperatures. He found that, agreeing with the beneficial acclimation hypothesis, colonies acclimated at 32 °C competed better at 32 °C. However, at 41.5 °C, colonies acclimated at 32 °C competed better as well. This led to the authors' rejection of the generality of beneficial acclimation. Huey et al. examined four previously conducted studies, applying the five competing hypotheses, and found that none of the results of the studies could be entirely explained by beneficial acclimation. Instead, a combination of hypotheses were required to explain the observed patterns of acclimation.

== Why acclimation is not beneficial ==
While it seems intuitive that acclimation would provide benefits to individuals, the majority of empirical tests of the hypothesis have rejected its general application. Why then is acclimation not beneficial? H. Arthur Woods and Jon F. Harrison examined the possible reasons in a 2002 Evolution paper. They suggested that:

1. The timescale of adaptation is much longer than that of environmental variation.

2. Environmental cues for timing of adaptive acclimation are unreliable.

3. It may cost more to adapt than not to.

4. Migration by adjacent populations may swamp out genes for adaptive acclimation.

== Criticism ==
In response to continuing rejections of the beneficial acclimation hypothesis, a number of common criticisms of experimental tests have been developed:

1. The majority of studies have actually been examining developmental acclimation. That is, rather than acclimating an adult individual and testing, they suggest that developmental switches triggered by particular temperatures result in a different mechanism of acclimation. More recently, it has been found that adult acclimation and developmental acclimation lead to support for different hypotheses.

2. Most studies have included stressful temperatures. Acclimation to those temperatures may decrease fitness in an individual.

3. Finally, a variety of traits are examined in these studies that may only be indirectly linked to fitness. For example, examining longevity as a fitness measure in D. melanogaster may be irrelevant since fertility declines rapidly with age in this species.

== Current state ==
The majority of studies have concluded the beneficial acclimation hypothesis is not true in all cases, and that alternate hypotheses should be tested. In addition to this, recent studies of the hypothesis have provided additional complications, such as trade-offs evident only in field environments and interactions with behavior and life history traits. The study of developmental and phenotypic plasticity continues.

== See also ==
- Acclimatisation
- Adaptation
- Ecophysiology
- Evolutionary physiology
- Fitness
- Physiology
