= Fine root =

A fine root is most commonly defined as a plant root that is two millimeters or less in diameter. Fine roots may function in acquisition of soil resources (eg. nutrients, water) and/or resource transport, making them functionally most analogous to the leaves and twigs in a plant's shoot system. Fine-root traits are variable between species and responsive to environmental conditions. Consequently, fine roots are studied to characterize the resource acquisition strategies and competitive ability of plant species. Categories of fine roots have been developed based on root diameter, position in a root system's branching hierarchy, and primary function. Fine roots are often associated with symbiotic fungi and play a role in many ecosystem processes like nutrient cycles and soil reinforcement.

== Overview ==
Fine roots collectively comprise the majority of total length of a root system in many perennial and annual plants. As they age and develop, their function shifts from primarily acquiring soil resources to transporting materials to other parts of the plant body. The primary function of a fine root can be determined based on its functional characteristics.

The traits of a plant species's fine roots are thought to be indicative of that species's evolved strategy for soil resource acquisition. Certain characteristics of fine-root growth and physiology are highly plastic, however, allowing a plant's roots to respond to the nature of the local soil environment. Fine roots have been shown to respond to soil nutrient patches. Responses include the lengthening of root segments and increased total length of fine roots, increased initiation of lateral roots, and increased branching. The effect of these responses on a plant's nutrient uptake is unclear. In multiple ecosystem types and forest stand ages, fine-root biomass has been found to decrease with increasing soil depth. Similarly, fine-root nitrogen concentration has been shown to be lower in deeper soil. These shifts may reflect vertical changes in the nature of soil, as shallow soils may have greater available nutrient content than deep soils. Features that appear to be lateral branch scars have been observed on fine roots, indicating that some fine roots are deciduous.

== Classification ==
Traditionally, fine roots are defined as plant roots with a diameter of two millimeters or less. This size-based definition is arbitrary, as it does not clearly or logically define fine roots based on anatomy, morphology, physiology, and/or function. Early studies that used this definition assumed that all roots in the two millimeter size class are functionally alike, but many successive studies have shown that roots in this size class can have different demographic and functional traits.

Within the two millimeter size class, roots can be highly variable in characteristics and function. To account for this, root biologists have begun to define subcategories of fine roots based on root diameter, position in the root branching hierarchy, and function.

=== Diameter-based classes ===
As a group, fine roots are most consistently defined by the diameter cutoff of two millimeters. In recognition of the variety of root traits and functions within this category and the relationship between diameter and function, smaller diameter classes have been used in recent research. Studies focusing only on roots that function in resource acquisition have examined roots under one millimeter or 0.5 millimeters. Roots with a diameter less than 0.5 millimeters have been termed 'very fine roots'. Because fine-root traits like diameter vary by species, and research examining the function of different root sizes in different species is limited, diameter-based classes of fine roots are mostly arbitrary and complicate cross-species comparisons. For example, two-millimeter-diameter fine roots may occur in trees, but would be very large roots in many annual and perennial species of crops.

=== Order-based classes ===
This classification system assigns an order number to a root based on that root's position in the branching hierarchy of the root system, and is based on the Horton-Strahler scheme for ordering stream tributaries. The most distal segments of the root system (unbranched root segments that end in root tips) are classified as first-order roots. When two roots of the same order converge, the root that results from their combination is assigned the next highest root order (so two first-order roots merge to form a second-order root). When two root segments of different orders meet, the resulting root is given the higher order of the two roots that merged (so a second-order and a first-order root combine to form a second-order root). This classification system is common in modern root research, as many studies have shown that significant differences in fine-root traits can be detected when distinguishing roots by order. Traits that have been shown to increase with root order include root diameter, life span, and secondary growth, while root nitrogen content, mycorrhizal colonization, and turnover have shown decreases with increasing root order.

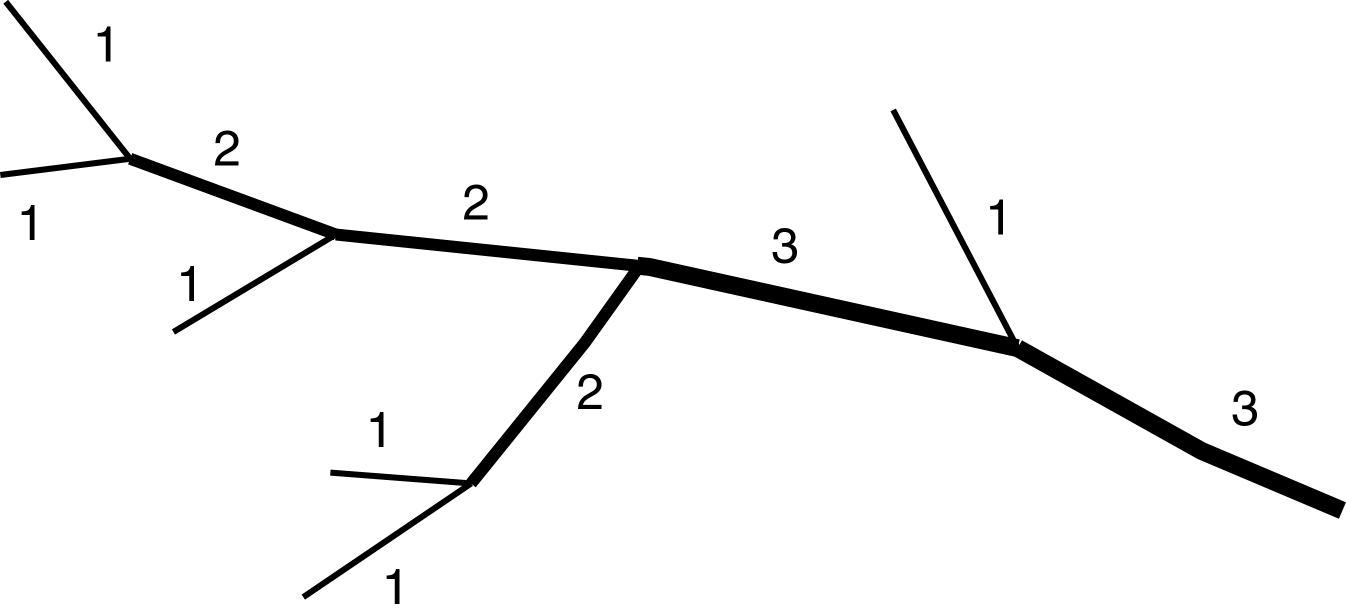
Orders assigned to stream segments using the Horton–Strahler ordering scheme. Root orders are assigned using this scheme.

=== Function-based classes ===
By this system, fine roots are classified as either absorptive fine roots or transport fine roots. Absorptive fine roots mostly function in acquiring soil resources and comprise the most distal segments of a root system (lower-order segments). Transport fine roots result from the merging of absorptive fine roots and are therefore higher in root order. Primarily, transport fine roots transport plant materials and support plant structure, but may also store plant materials. These functional classes can often be distinguished visually in trees, but not in crops.

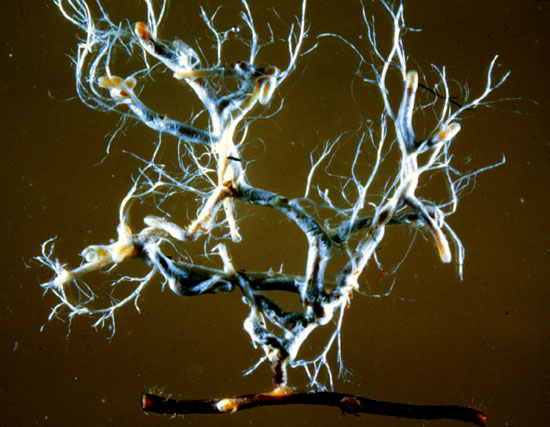
Douglas-fir fine roots associate with ectomycorrhizal fungi.

== Ecology ==
=== Mycorrhizal associations ===
In trees, fine roots are generally exclusively or dominantly colonized by a single mycorrhizal type, either arbuscular mycorrhizae or ectomycorrhizae.

=== Competition ===
Plants often compete with surrounding plants for root space and resources. A plant's ability to compete, and strategy for competition, can be determined by examining the traits, abundance, distribution, and functions of fine roots and their associated mycorrhizas.

=== Material cycling ===
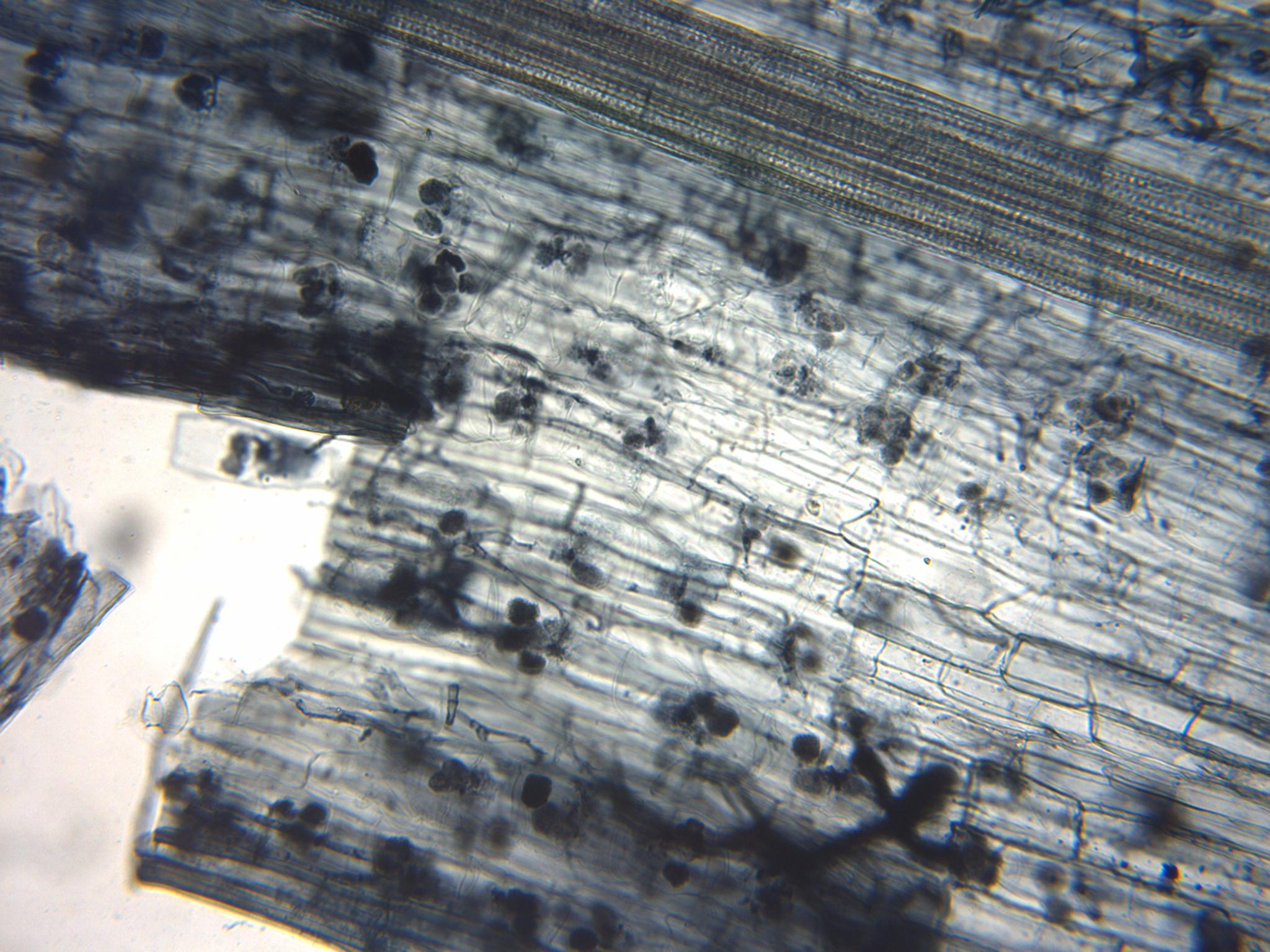
Flax roots associate with arbuscular mycorrhizal fungi.

In terrestrial environments, fine roots absorb water and nutrients from soil, and return such resources to the soil upon death and decomposition. Fine roots also release exudates, including labile carbon, during life processes and turnover. This directly affects soil organic carbon pools, and indirectly affects them by stimulating microbial activity. Therefore, fine roots play a role in water, carbon, and nutrient cycles of terrestrial ecosystems. In forest carbon and nutrient cycles, the formation, death, and decomposition of fine roots can account for 20-80% of total net primary production.

=== Soil reinforcement ===
Plant roots support soil, which stabilizes sloped landscapes and limits soil erosion. Root size properties, including diameter, influence the mechanical reinforcement of a slope. Soil stability depends on root tensile strength. Root tensile strength increases with decreasing root diameter, so fine roots are stronger than coarse roots.

== See also ==
- Absorption of water
- Mycorrhiza
- Plant nutrition
- Plant physiology
- Rhizosphere
- Root
