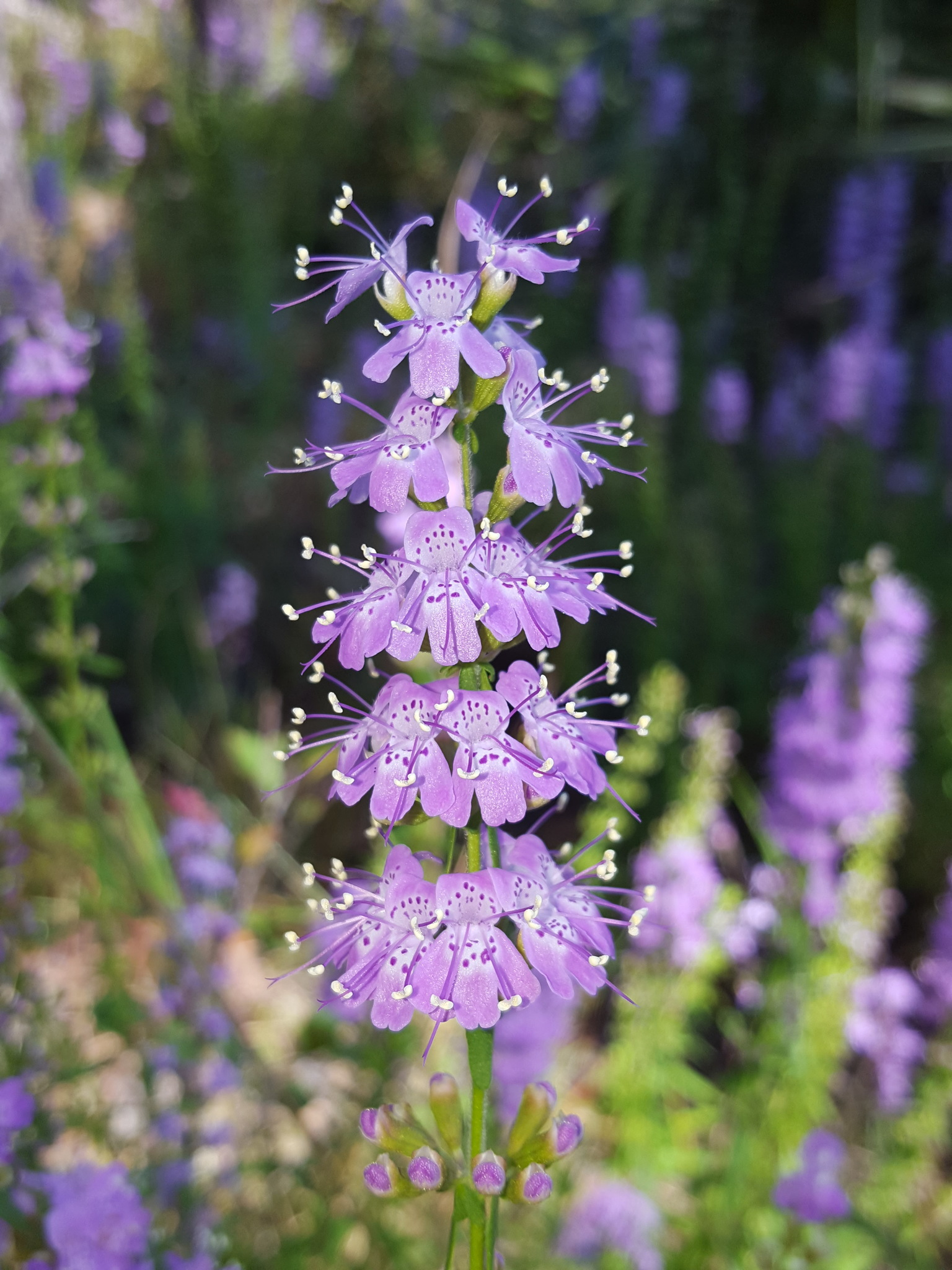

Scientific classification
- Kingdom: Plantae
- Clade: Tracheophytes
- Clade: Angiosperms
- Clade: Eudicots
- Clade: Asterids
- Order: Lamiales
- Family: Lamiaceae
- Genus: Dicerandra
- Species: D. densiflora

Binomial name
- Dicerandra densiflora Benth.

= Dicerandra densiflora =

Species of flowering plant

Dicerandra densiflora, the Florida balm, is a species of flowering plant in the mint family known by the common names scrub mint and scrub balm. It is native to North Central Florida, where it occurs along sand hill habitats. It is a member of the annual subclade of Dicerandra. D. densiflora grows up to 2 ft (61 cm) tall. Flower petals are lavender to purple in color with dark spots.
