= Ancylocera sergioi =

Scientific classification
- Domain: Eukaryota
- Kingdom: Animalia
- Phylum: Arthropoda
- Class: Insecta
- Order: Coleoptera
- Suborder: Polyphaga
- Infraorder: Cucujiformia
- Family: Cerambycidae
- Genus: Ancylocera
- Species: A. sergioi

Binomial name
- Ancylocera sergioi Monné & Napp, 2001

Species of beetle

Ancylocera sergioi is a species of beetle in the family Cerambycidae. It was described by Monné & Napp in 2001.
