= Ancylocera bruchi =

Scientific classification
- Domain: Eukaryota
- Kingdom: Animalia
- Phylum: Arthropoda
- Class: Insecta
- Order: Coleoptera
- Suborder: Polyphaga
- Infraorder: Cucujiformia
- Family: Cerambycidae
- Genus: Ancylocera
- Species: A. bruchi

Binomial name
- Ancylocera bruchi Viana, 1971

Species of beetle

Ancylocera bruchi is a species of beetle in the family Cerambycidae. It was described by Viana in 1971.
