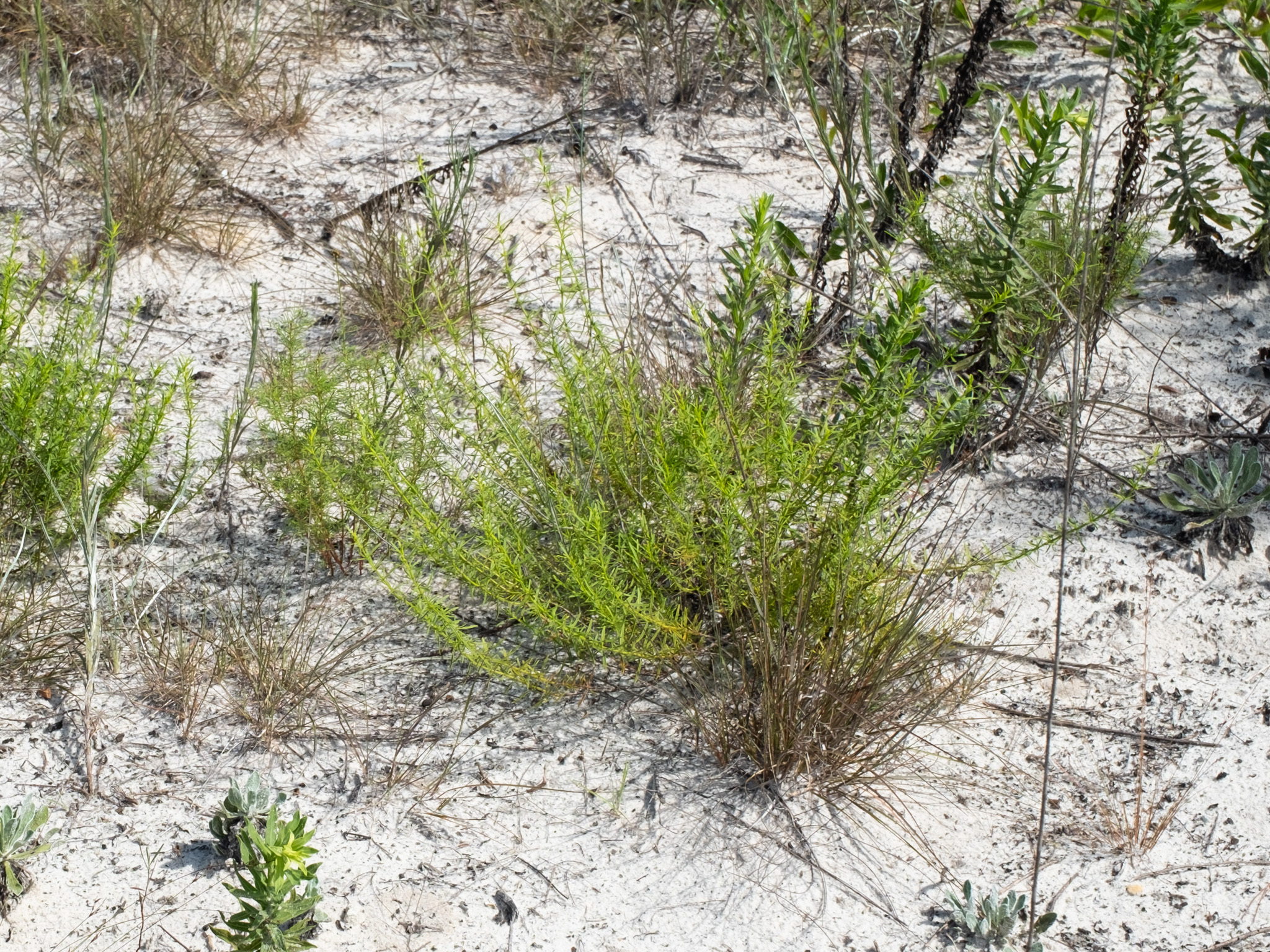

Conservation status
- Unranked (NatureServe)

Scientific classification
- Kingdom: Plantae
- Clade: Tracheophytes
- Clade: Angiosperms
- Clade: Eudicots
- Clade: Asterids
- Order: Lamiales
- Family: Lamiaceae
- Genus: Dicerandra
- Species: D. thinicola

Binomial name
- Dicerandra thinicola H.A.Mill.

= Dicerandra thinicola =

Species of flowering plant

Dicerandra thinicola, known as Titusville mint or Titusville balm, is a species of Dicerandra native to the Atlantic Coastal Ridge along the Central Florida coast. It is restricted to a 50-km range, and all known natural populations of D. thinicola are located in Brevard County, Florida, near the city of Titusville. Most populations are located on private lands with conservation easements. The Dicerandra Scrub Sanctuary was created in 2002 on public lands in order to protect populations of this species from human development.

Recent research indicates that disturbance, particularly fire disturbance, is key for population growth in D. thinicola. It is a short-lived perennial (typically living less than 10 years).
