= Dicerandra radfordiana =

Conservation status
- Critically Imperiled (NatureServe)

Scientific classification
- Kingdom: Plantae
- Clade: Tracheophytes
- Clade: Angiosperms
- Clade: Eudicots
- Clade: Asterids
- Order: Lamiales
- Family: Lamiaceae
- Genus: Dicerandra
- Species: D. radfordiana

Binomial name
- Dicerandra radfordiana Huck

Species of flowering plant

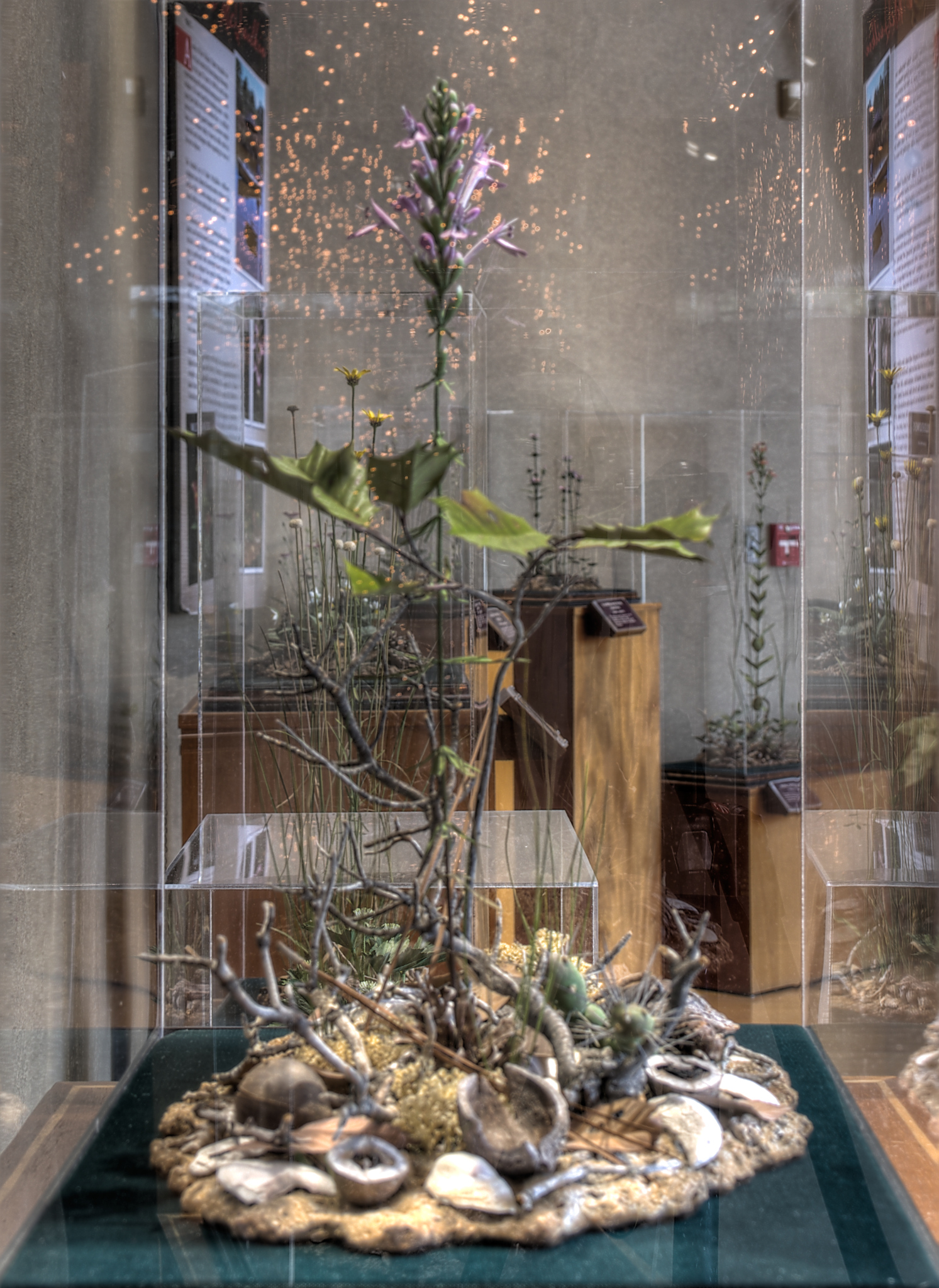
Dicerandra radfordiana exhibit at Callaway Gardens

Dicerandra radfordiana, or Radford's balm, is an annual species of Dicerandra native to Eastern Georgia. It is found along the Altamaha River bluffs where deep, well drained sands are common. Only two populations are currently known, with one on public land and another, on private land, where it is protected by a conservation easement. The size of each population varies from year to year depending on the amount of rainfall.
