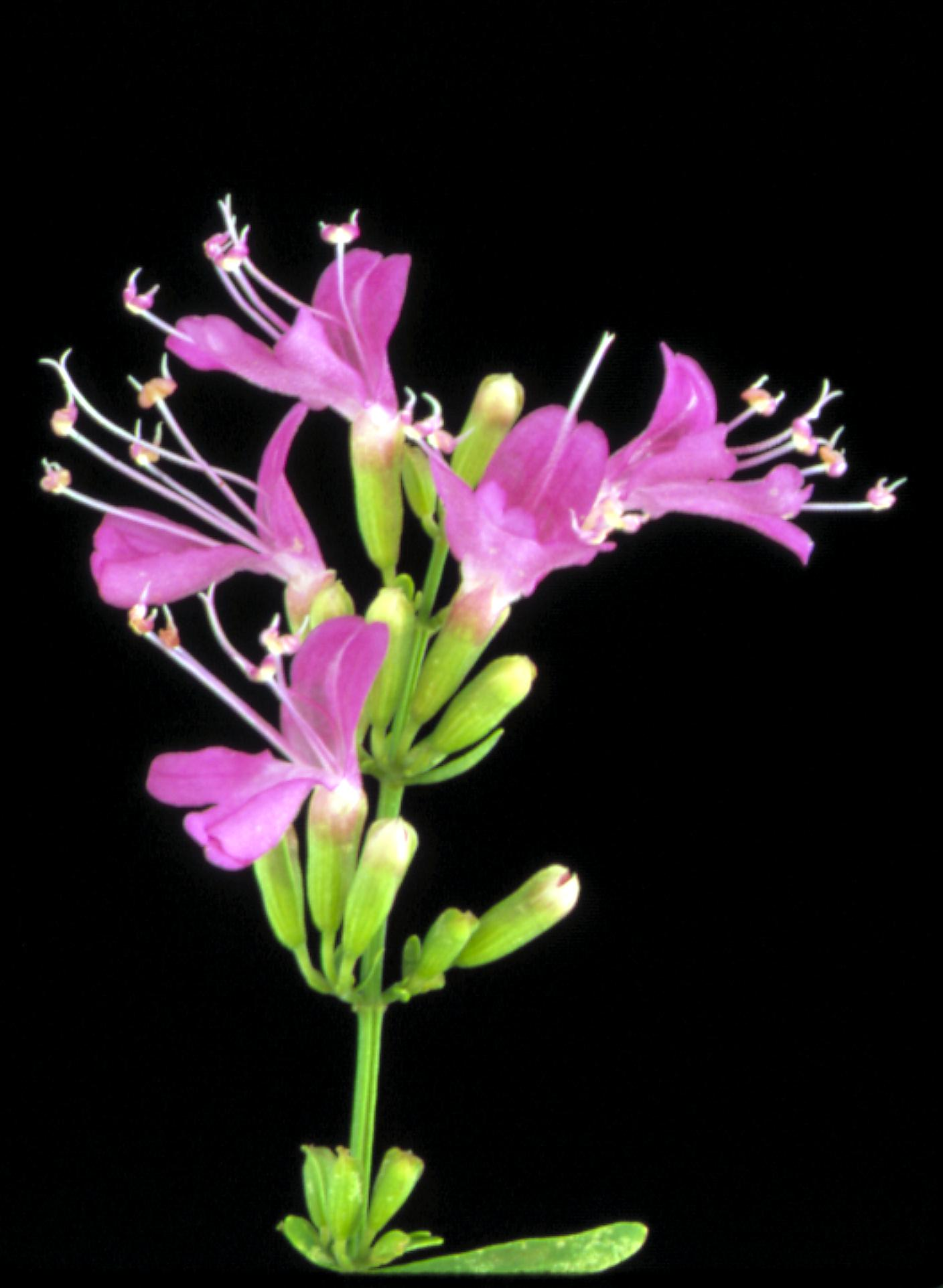

Conservation status
- Critically Imperiled (NatureServe)

- Endangered (ESA)

Scientific classification
- Kingdom: Plantae
- Clade: Tracheophytes
- Clade: Angiosperms
- Clade: Eudicots
- Clade: Asterids
- Order: Lamiales
- Family: Lamiaceae
- Genus: Dicerandra
- Species: D. immaculata

Binomial name
- Dicerandra immaculata Lakela

= Dicerandra immaculata =

Species of flowering plant

Dicerandra immaculata is a rare species of flowering plant in the mint family known by the common names Lakela's mint, Olga's mint, and spotless balm. It is endemic to Florida in the United States, where it is known only from Indian River and St. Lucie counties. There are seven occurrences of the plant, two of which are scheduled for destruction as the land is cleared for development. The plant was federally listed as an endangered species in 1985.

This is an aromatic perennial shrub growing up to about half a meter tall, with several erect stems emerging from a woody-topped taproot. The narrow leaves are up to 3 centimeters long by 4 millimeters wide. The herbage is mint-scented. One to three flowers occur in the leaf axils. The flower is purplish pink in color and lacks the spots that those of many other Dicerandra have. The throat of the flower is tubular and not bent. The anthers of the flowers have tiny spurs that act as triggers, causing the flower to release pollen when an insect arrives. There are two varieties of this plant, with var. savannarum having been described in 2001. It has wider leaves and more limp branches than var. immaculata.

This plant grows in white- and yellow-sand Florida scrub habitat. It can be found in openings and slightly shady areas where the wind or wildfire has cleared a partial or total space in the canopy. This habitat is becoming ever more rare today as it is consumed for development; Florida's population is growing rapidly. Several known populations of this plant have been destroyed in the process. Remaining tracts of land are very fragmented.

There are not many predators that tolerate the strong oils of this mint, so herbivory is not a serious problem. Mildew affects the nectaries sometimes, however, causing fruit destruction. Invasive plant species that threaten the habitat include Brazilian pepper (Schinus terebinthifolius), rosary pea (Abrus precatorius), Natal grass (Rhynchelytrum repens), and Guinea grass (Panicum maximum).

Some new populations of the species have been planted in areas that are protected, even though they are outside the known historical range of the plant.
