= Ancylocera bicolor =

Scientific classification
- Kingdom: Animalia
- Phylum: Arthropoda
- Clade: Pancrustacea
- Class: Insecta
- Order: Coleoptera
- Suborder: Polyphaga
- Infraorder: Cucujiformia
- Family: Cerambycidae
- Genus: Ancylocera
- Species: A. bicolor

Binomial name
- Ancylocera bicolor (Olivier, 1795)

Species of beetle

Ancylocera bicolor is a species of beetle in the family Cerambycidae. It was described by Oliver in 1795.
