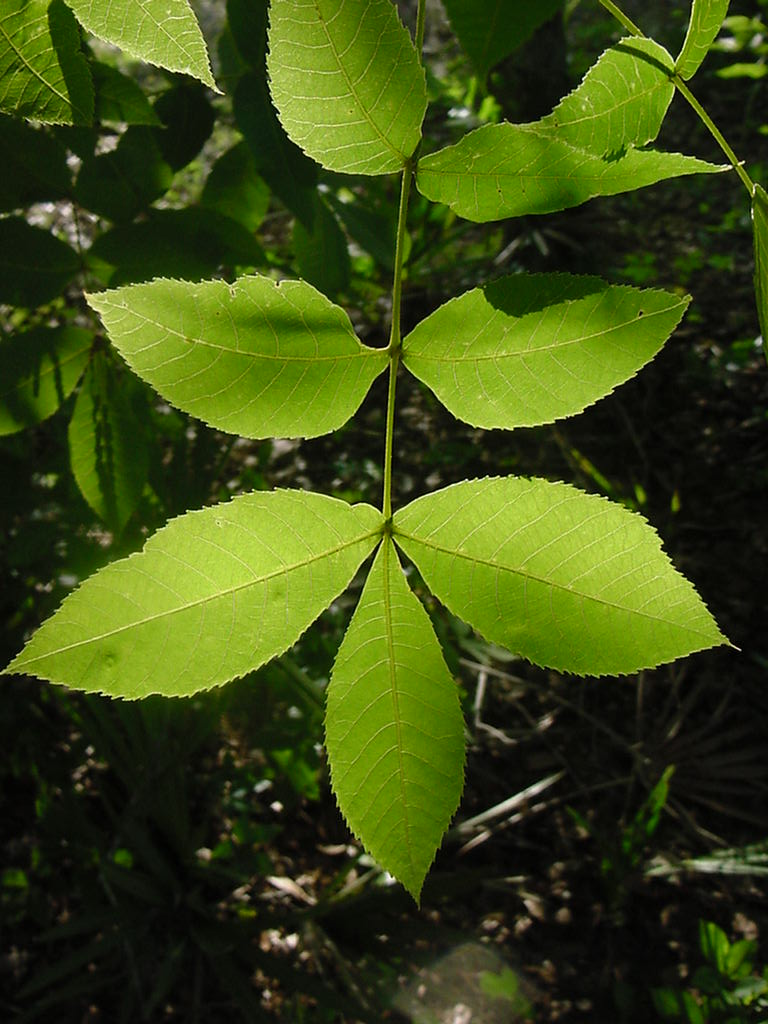
- Compound leaf of the scrub hickory

Conservation status
- Least Concern (IUCN 3.1)

- Apparently Secure (NatureServe)

Scientific classification
- Kingdom: Plantae
- Clade: Embryophytes
- Clade: Tracheophytes
- Clade: Angiosperms
- Clade: Eudicots
- Clade: Rosids
- Order: Fagales
- Family: Juglandaceae
- Genus: Carya
- Section: Carya sect. Carya
- Species: C. floridana

Binomial name
- Carya floridana Sarg.
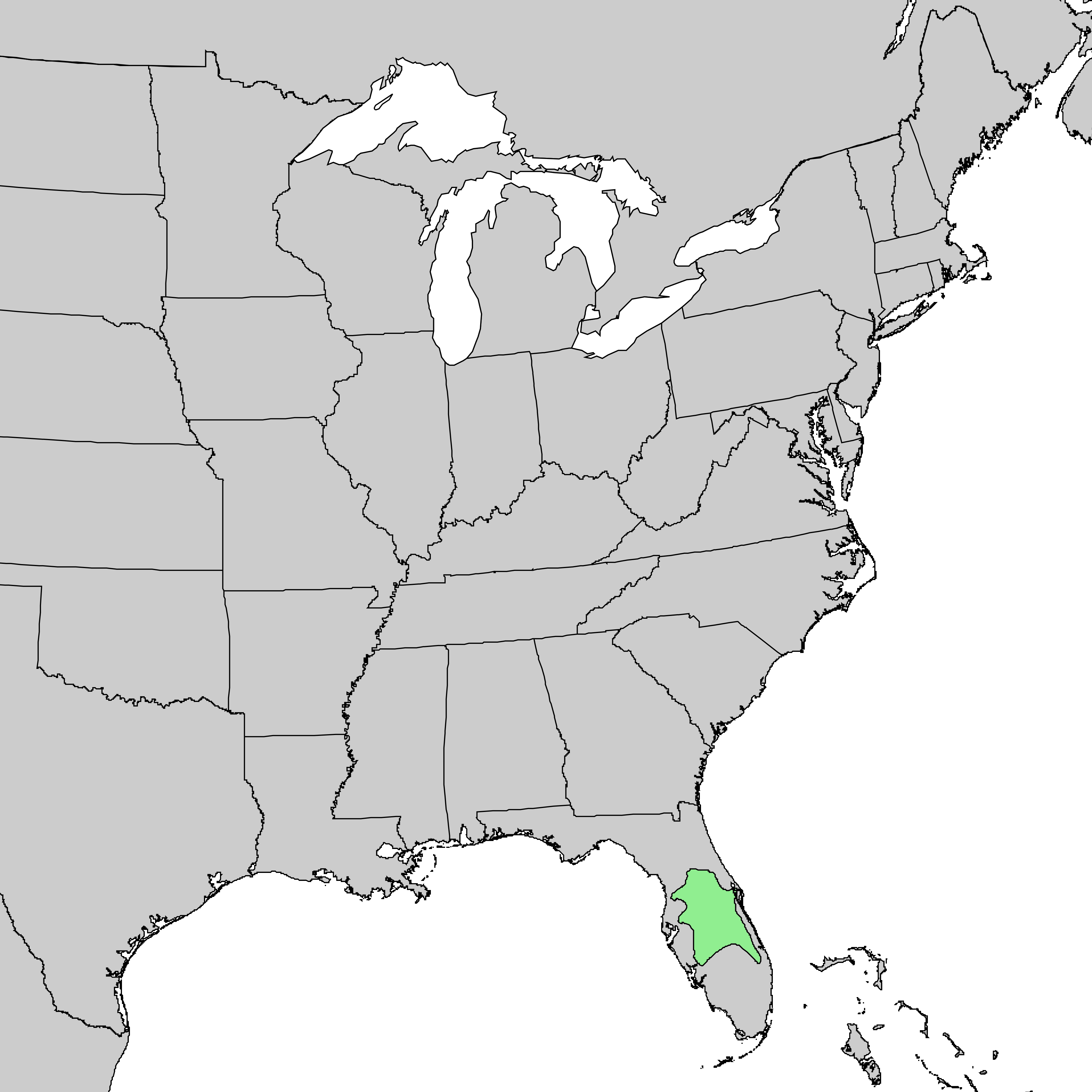
- Natural range of Carya floridana

= Carya floridana =

Scrub hickory

Species of tree

Carya floridana (syn. Hicoria floridana) the scrub hickory, is a small tree native to the Southeast United States, where it is endemic to central Florida.

== Description ==
Although Carya floridana can grow to the height of 25 m (80 ft), most specimens are shrubs 3–5 m tall, with many small trunks. The leaves are 20–30 cm long, pinnate, with three to seven leaflets, each leaflet 4–10 cm long and 2–4 cm broad, with a coarsely toothed margin. The fruit is a nut 3–4 cm long and 2-2.5 cm diameter, with a thick, hard shell and a sweet, edible seed. The seeds require stratification to germinate.

Scrub hickories are deciduous. Most scrub hickories are small, resembling shrubs. The bark of the scrub hickory is a light gray, and the texture can vary from smooth to fissured. Branches are a reddish-brown color, and can be scaly or glabrous. The leaves are compound, and are usually yellowish green. Leaflets are 3 to 5, but some occasionally have 7. Older leaves have a rusty tint on the underside. Outer leaf buds are also covered in rust colored scales. The flowers are pistillate and staminate, which consist of 3 branched catkins, and tightly crowded clusters. The nuts of the scrub hickory are oblong-oval shaped. The nut is thick shelled and hard to crack. Only one nut per flower cluster matures. The meat of the nut is sweet and high in nutritional value, more so than the other Carya and Quercus species it co-occurs with. The scrub hickory can hybridize with the Pignut hickory (Carya glabra).

== Taxonomy ==
Carya floridana is geographically separated from the similar black hickory (Carya texana). The scrub hickory intergrades with the pignut hickory (Carya glabra) where ranges overlap. The Scrub Hickory is in the Order Fagales, and in the family Juglandaceae. The Scrub Hickory was identified and named by Charles Sprague Sargent. The original Latin name was Hicorius floridana, but it has since been revised. Close relatives include the Pignut Hickory (Carya glabra), the Black Hickory (Carya texicana), and the Sand Hickory (Carya pallida).

=== Genetics ===
Scrub hickory is a 64-chromosome species.

== Ecology ==
The Scrub hickory is host to many organisms, such as Burrowing Wolf Spiders (Geolycosa sp.). The most common species associated with scrub hickory include the Archbold's Burrowing Wolf Spider (G.xera archibaldi) . Longhorn beetles (Cerambycidae) are also common on scrub hickories. The beetle, Ancylocera bicolor uses the scrub hickory as a host plant.

== Range ==
The Scrub hickory is native to Florida, and no records of it are found in other southeastern states. The scrub hickory is found in De Soto, Orange and Volusia counties. The scrub hickory may also be found around the Pensacola Bay and Jupiter Island.

== Propagation and Culture ==
Scrub hickories propagate well in sandy, loamy or clay soils. Well drained soils are preferred. The optimum soil pH is a mildly basic, neutral or mildly alkaline. US Hardiness zones for the scrub hickory are from Zone 8 to Zone 10. It is unknown what other hardiness zones the scrub hickory can tolerate, but it is inferred that the scrub hickory could propagate well within other parts of the lower southeastern US states. The scrub hickory is tolerant of moist or dry soils. It is a shade intolerant tree. Scrub hickories cannot tolerate brackish or salt water and they cannot tolerate salty spray or wind. Optimal planting time is through April to May The scrub hickory is a good tree species for landscaping in some situations due to its diminutive size.

== Uses ==
Scrub hickories are commonly used as food sources by multiple animals, the nuts are high in protein and fat. The nuts contain macronutrients such as copper, zinc, iron, and other minerals. As with most hickories, the nuts are of scrub hickory are edible. They are not commonly consumed because the nuts are hard to open. Common birds that feed on the scrub hickory include the Florida Scrub Jay, the blue jay, the red bellied woodpecker and the red headed woodpecker. Larger mammals such as bears, raccoons, foxes, mice and feral hogs are reported to eat the nuts of the scrub hickory. It is unclear if the scrub hickory is used for lumber. A railroad station in Highlands county is named after the scrub hickory, its name was changed from "Red Hills" to "Hicoria", as is the local post office.
