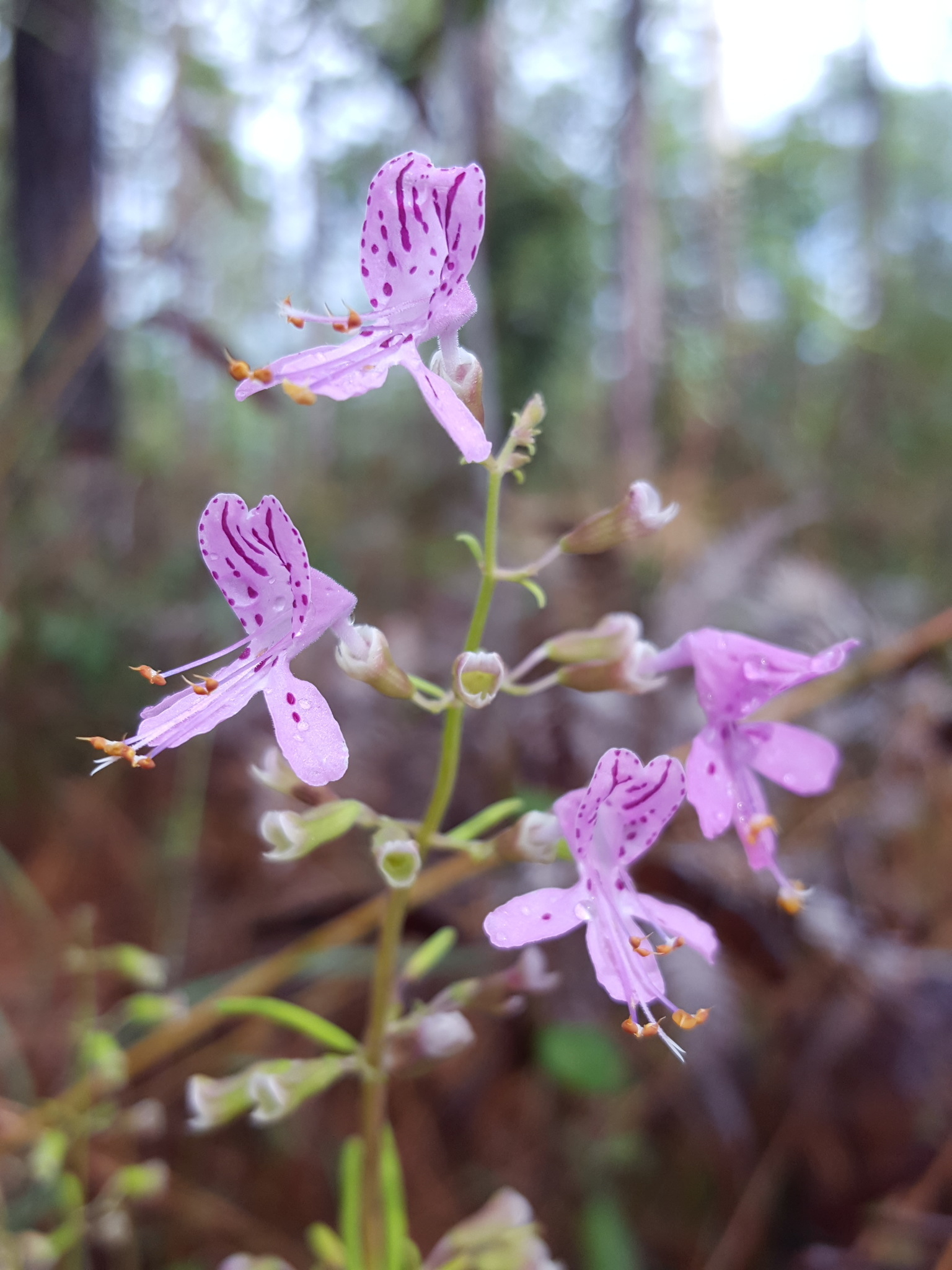

Scientific classification
- Kingdom: Plantae
- Clade: Tracheophytes
- Clade: Angiosperms
- Clade: Eudicots
- Clade: Asterids
- Order: Lamiales
- Family: Lamiaceae
- Genus: Dicerandra
- Species: D. linearifolia

Binomial name
- Dicerandra linearifolia (Elliott) Benth.

= Dicerandra linearifolia =

Species of flowering plant

Dicerandra linearifolia, or coastal plain balm, is a species of Dicerandra native to the Southeastern Coastal Plain, United States.

It is the species of Dicerandra with the widest distribution, spreading from Alabama in the west to southern Georgia in the east, and south to the Florida Panhandle. Its range ends abruptly in the pine barrens ecosystem located along the Fall Line in southwestern Georgia.

There are two varieties of D. linearifolia: D. linearifolia var. linearifolia, and D. linearifolia var. robustior. Both are native to sand hill habitats.
