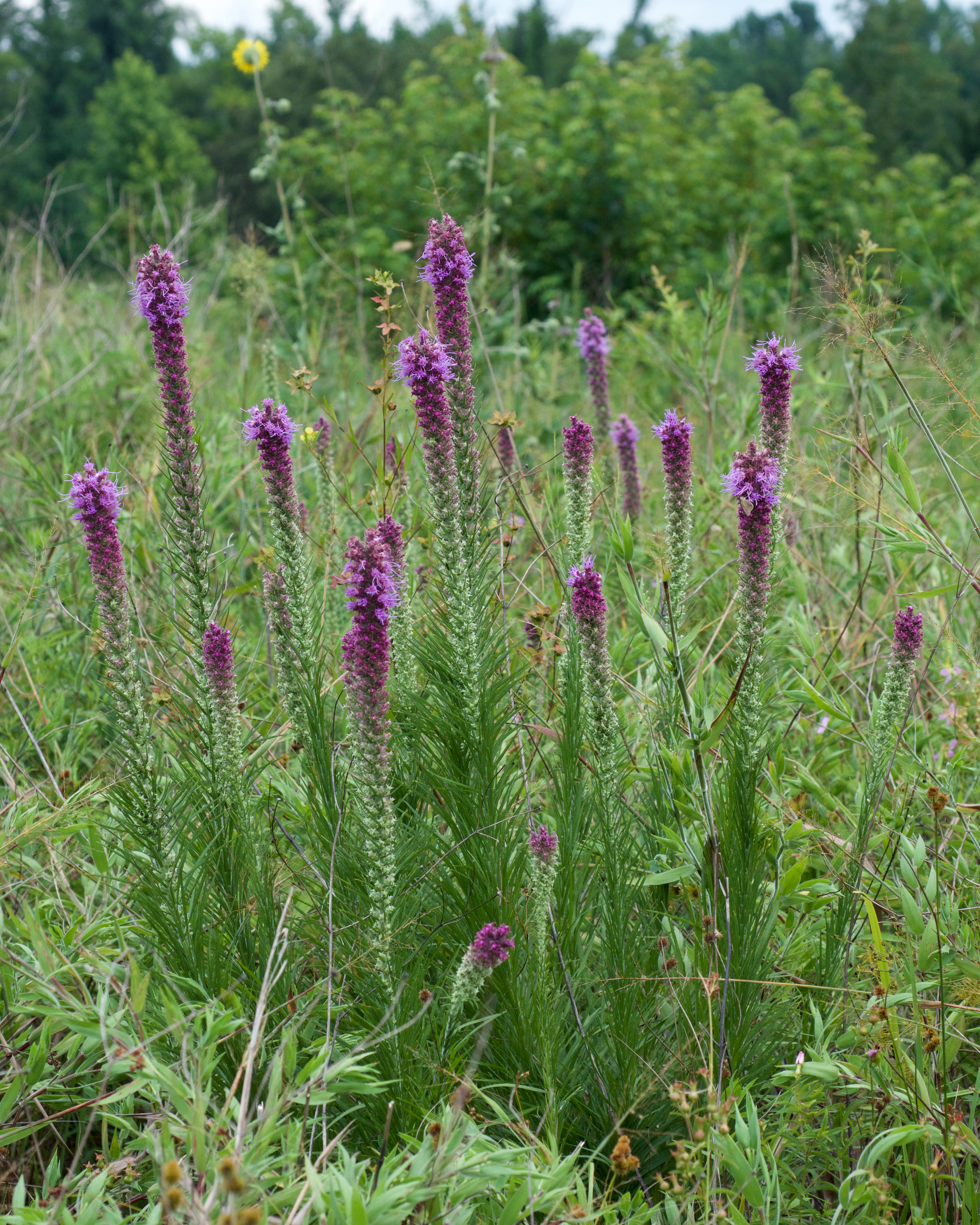

Conservation status
- Secure (NatureServe)

Scientific classification
- Kingdom: Plantae
- Clade: Tracheophytes
- Clade: Angiosperms
- Clade: Eudicots
- Clade: Asterids
- Order: Asterales
- Family: Asteraceae
- Genus: Liatris
- Species: L. pycnostachya

Binomial name
- Liatris pycnostachya Michx.

= Liatris pycnostachya =

Species of flowering plant

Liatris pycnostachya, the prairie blazing star, cattail gayfeather, Kansas gayfeather, or cattail blazing star, is a perennial plant in the Asteraceae family that is native to the tallgrass prairies of the central United States.

== Description ==
The flower stalks reach 60 to 120 cm (2 to 4 ft) in height, or rarely to 180 cm (6 ft). The leaves are linear, grass-like, 11 to 22 cm (4 1/4 to 8 3/4 in) long and 4 to 10 mm (0.16 to 0.39 in) wide. They grow both from the root and in great numbers on the flower stems, becoming progressively smaller higher up the stem. The end of the flower stem is covered in a spike of flower heads 1/4 to 1/2 in (6 to 13 mm) across that bloom pink to purplish pink for a month in late summer, from the top down. Each flower head has 5 to 8 florets and is surrounded by overlapping pinkish bracts (phyllaries) whose tips are pointed and curve backwards. The stems, leaves, and bracts may be smooth or hairy to varying degrees. The shape of the bracts distinguishes this species from others, for example Liatris spicata, another tall Liatris species that has thickly packed spikes, but whose bracts are flat with rounded tips.

The root system is a corm that sometimes develops into a rhizome. It produces offsets and gradually forms a clump.

== Etymology ==
The species epithet comes from Ancient Greek πυκνός (puknós) "dense" and στάχυς (stákhus) "ear of grain", referring to the thickly packed spike of flowers.

== Distribution and habitat ==
Its native habitats include prairies, open woods, and meadows.

== Ecology ==
The plant attracts birds, hummingbirds, and butterflies. It is a larval host to the bleeding flower moth (Schinia sanguinea).

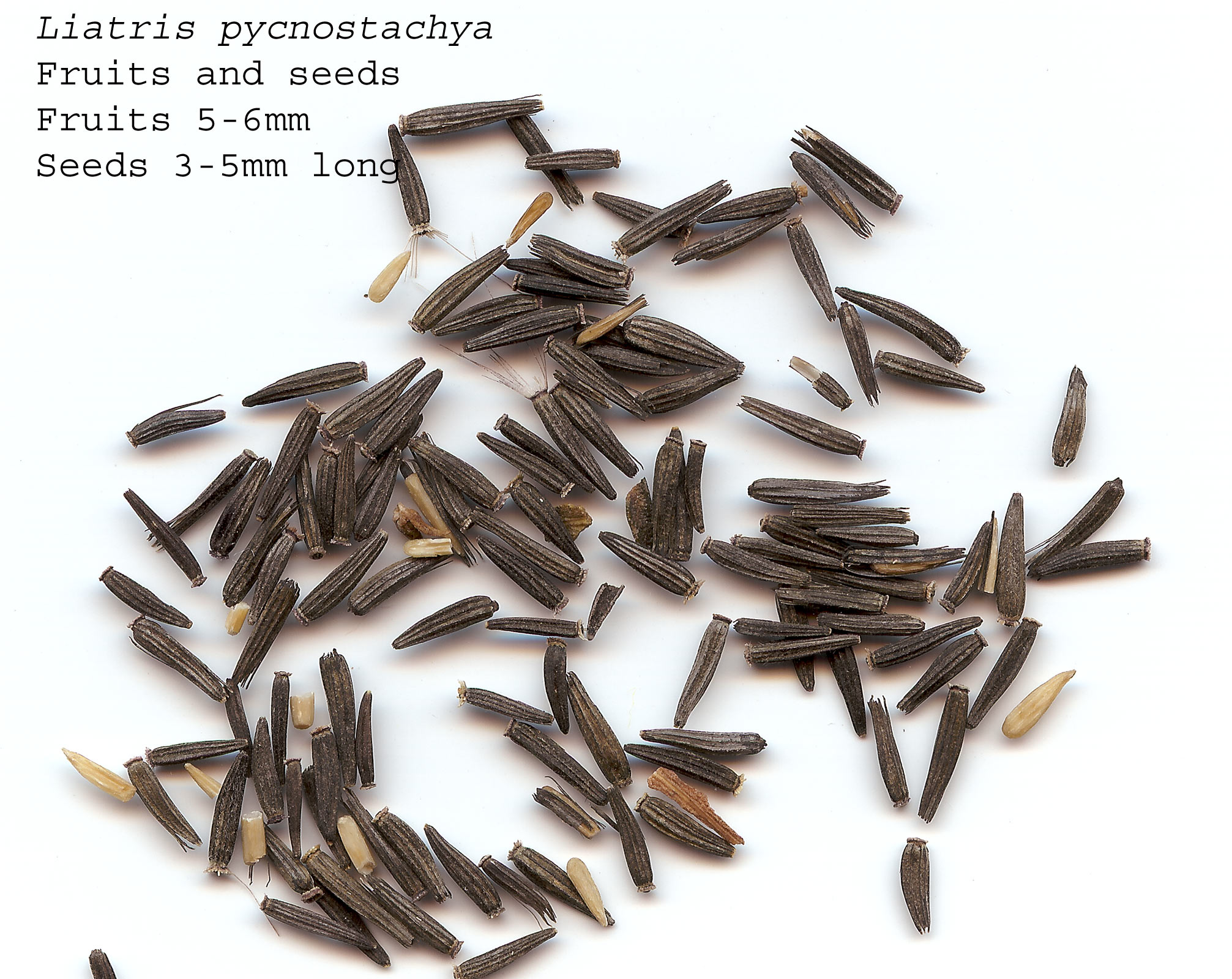
Seeds of Liatris pycnostachya
