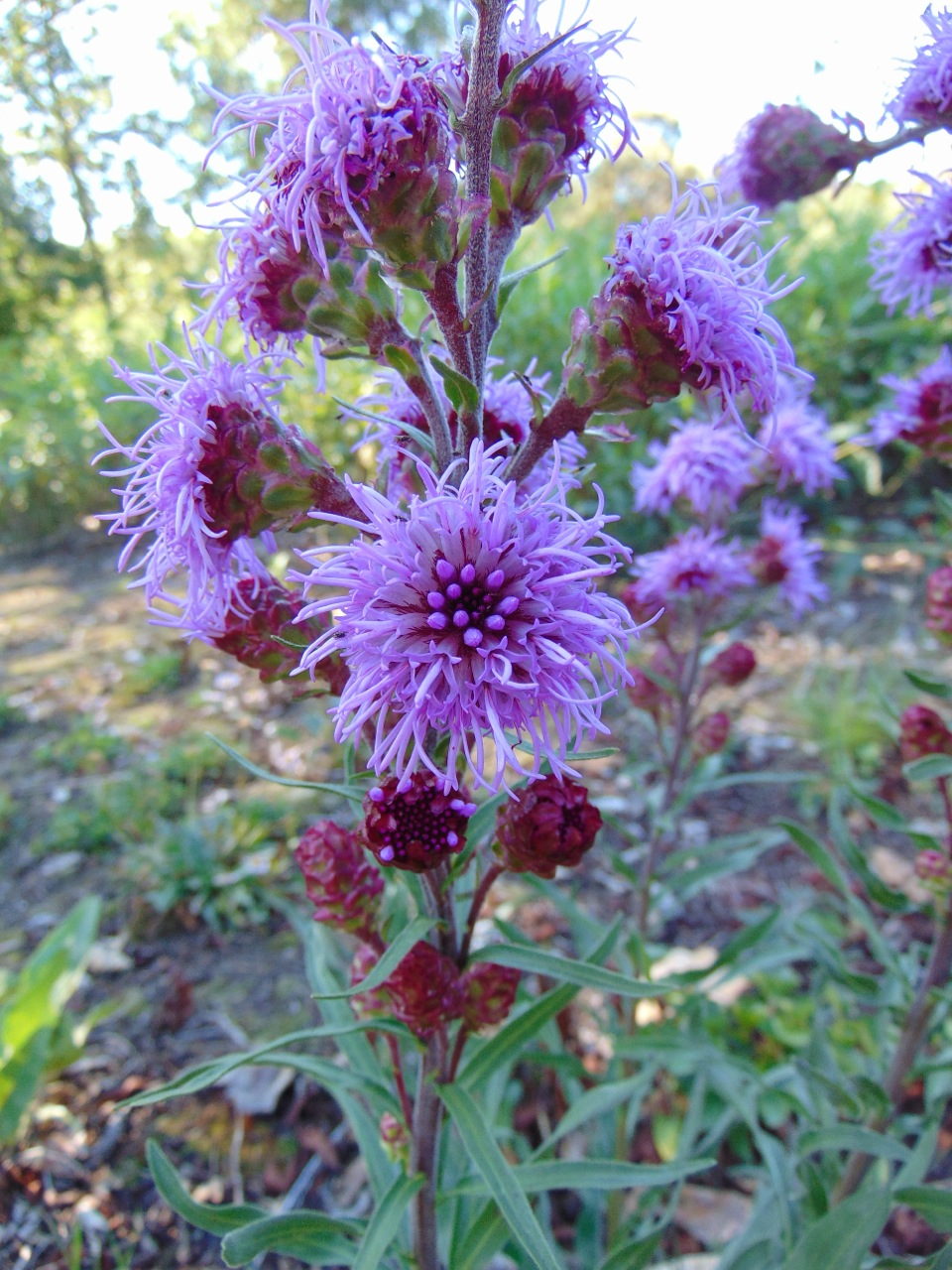

Conservation status
- Secure (NatureServe)

Scientific classification
- Kingdom: Plantae
- Clade: Tracheophytes
- Clade: Angiosperms
- Clade: Eudicots
- Clade: Asterids
- Order: Asterales
- Family: Asteraceae
- Genus: Liatris
- Species: L. ligulistylis

Binomial name
- Liatris ligulistylis (A.Nelson) K.Schum.

Synonyms
- Lacinaria ligulistylis A.Nelson

= Liatris ligulistylis =

Species of flowering plant

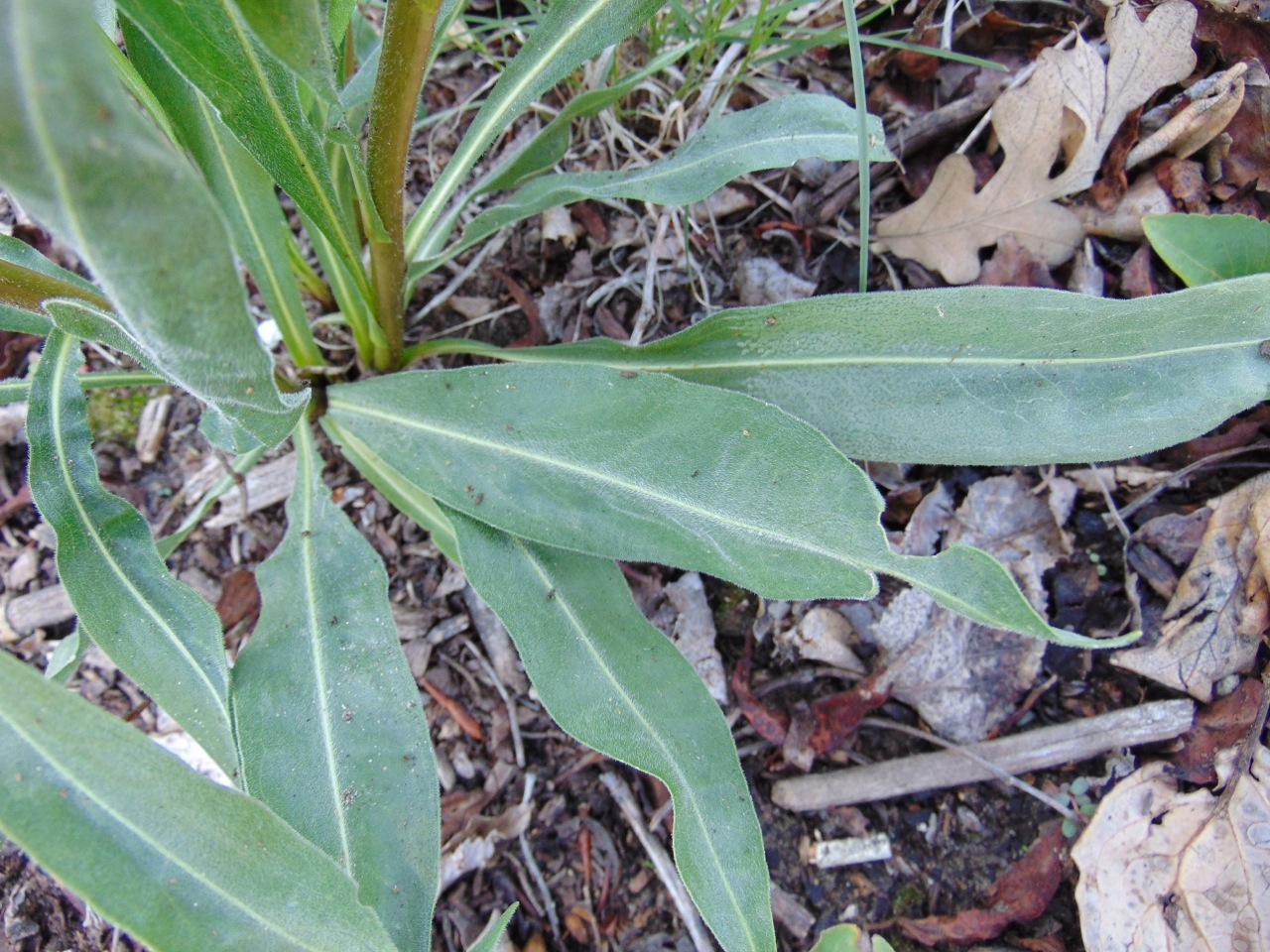
Basal leaves

Liatris ligulistylis (Rocky Mountain blazing star, northern plains blazing star, or meadow blazing star) is a flowering plant of the family Asteraceae, native to the central United States and central Canada.

== Description ==
The leaves have whitish midribs, and are positioned basally and mostly alternately on the stem. They vary from linear and sessile nearer the top of the plant, to oblanceolate with petioles nearer the bottom. The stem is up to 100 cm (39 in). The stem and leaves are sparsely to densely covered with short white hairs.

There are 4–21 flowers arranged in a loose raceme on the upper part of the stem, with rounded pinkish purple flower heads on 8–15 mm (5/16–9/16 in) stems. Each flower head has 30-100 five-lobed, tubular flowers surrounded by spoon-shaped bracts (phyllaries) with translucent, jagged, and often purple edges that fold inward. Each flower has a long, thread-like, divided style protruding from the center. The fruits (cypselae) are 5–7 mm (3/16–1/4 in) long, each with a ring (pappus) of barbed hairs at the top.

Liatris aspera is similar to Liatris ligulistylis in having button-like flower heads, but the stalks of its flower heads are shorter or absent altogether, and it prefers drier habitats.

== Ecology ==
The flowers are popular with monarch butterflies, and it is a host for the bleeding flower moth (Schinia sanguinea).
