= Savanna blazing star =

Savanna blazing star is a common name for several plants and may refer to:

- Liatris savannensis, native to southwestern Florida
- Liatris scariosa, native to eastern North America
