= Devil's bite =

Devil's bite is a common name for several plants and may refer to:

- Liatris scariosa, native to eastern North America, producing purple flowers
- Veratrum viride, native to North America, producing green flowers

== See also ==
- Devilsbit
