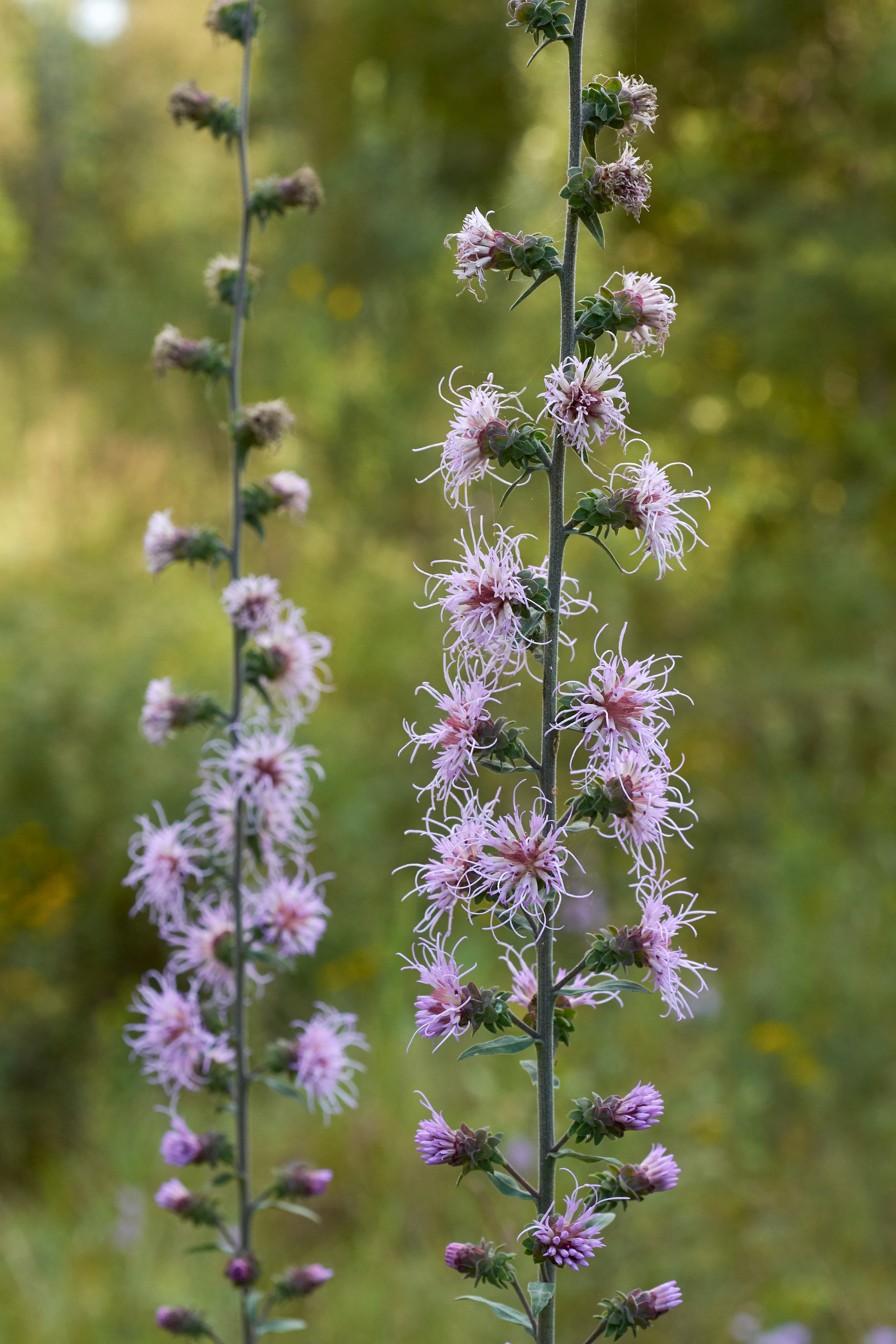

Scientific classification
- Kingdom: Plantae
- Clade: Tracheophytes
- Clade: Angiosperms
- Clade: Eudicots
- Clade: Asterids
- Order: Asterales
- Family: Asteraceae
- Genus: Liatris
- Species: L. squarrulosa

Binomial name
- Liatris squarrulosa Michx.

= Liatris squarrulosa =

Species of flowering plant

Liatris squarrulosa, commonly called Appalachian blazing star or southern blazingstar, is an herbaceous perennial plant is the family Asteraceae. It is native to the Southeastern United States where it is found in naturally open communities, such as prairies and savannas.

It produces purple heads of flowers in late summer through fall.
