= Liatris bracteata =

Conservation status
- Imperiled (NatureServe)

Scientific classification
- Kingdom: Plantae
- Clade: Tracheophytes
- Clade: Angiosperms
- Clade: Eudicots
- Clade: Asterids
- Order: Asterales
- Family: Asteraceae
- Genus: Liatris
- Species: L. bracteata

Binomial name
- Liatris bracteata Gaiser

Species of flowering plant

Liatris bracteata, commonly known as the bracted blazing star, or South Texas gayfeather, is a species of flowering plant in the family Asteraceae. It is native to Texas in the United States, where it is found in coastal prairies, roadsides, and along railroads with clay or sandy loam soils. This species is of conservation concern in its native range due to habitat loss.

== Description ==
Liatris bracteata grows from rounded corms that produce hairless, 25 to 75 cm (9.8 to 29.5 in) tall stems. The flowers are in loose heads that are widely spaced from each other on the stem. The heads have no stems (sessile) and are arranged in a spike-like collection. The foliage is dotted with glands and the basal and cauline leaves have one nerve and are linear in shape.

The seeds are produced in cypselae (a type of fruit) that are 6 to 9 mm (0.24 to 0.35 in) long. The fruits have feathery bristles attached at the top.

Liatris bracteata flowers in September to November.

== Taxonomy ==
Liatris bracteata might be a variety of Liatris punctata, with the morphological differences primarily in the number of florets per flower head. It is genetically a hexaploid, while populations of L. punctata are diploid and tetraploid.
