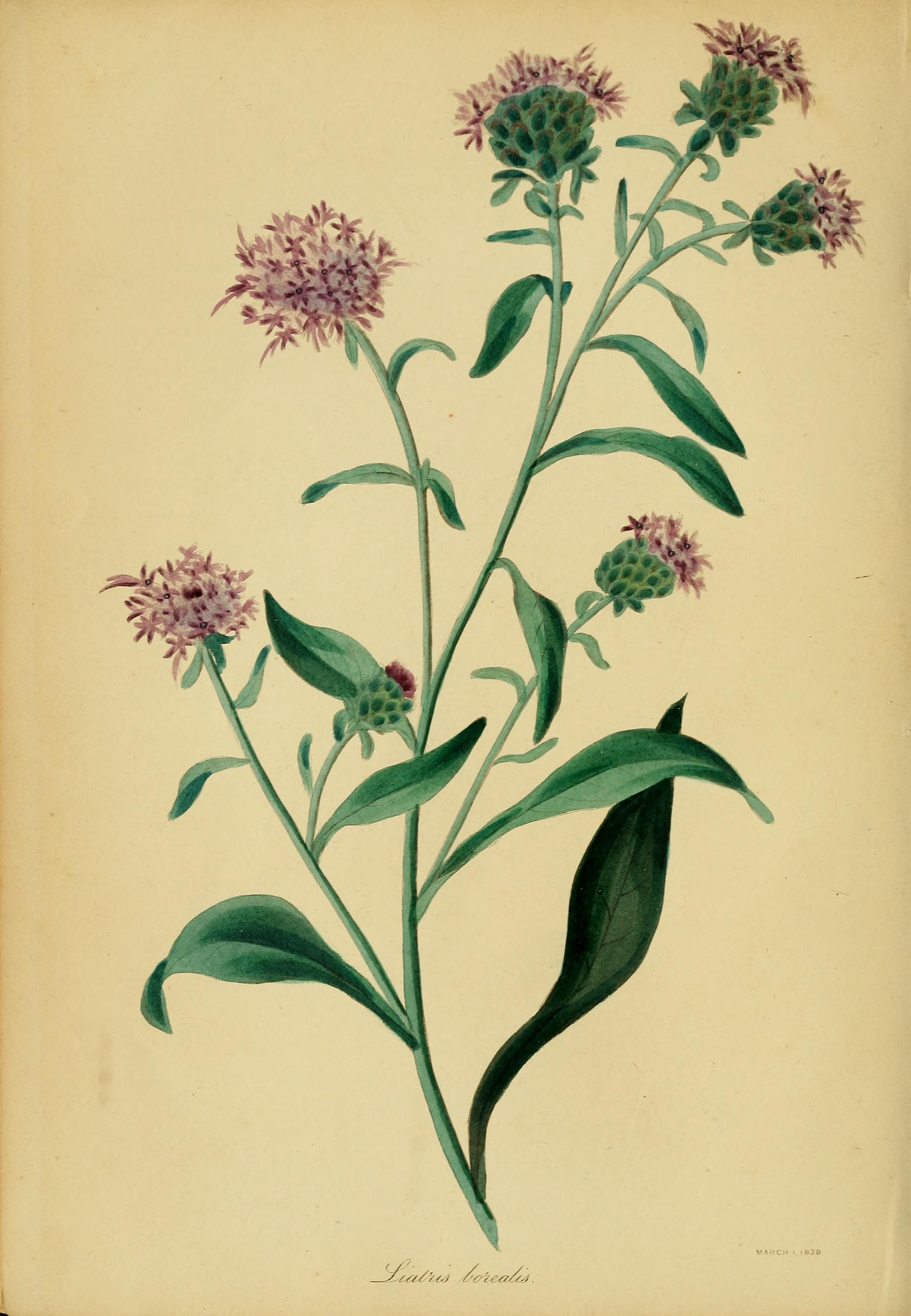
- 1838 botanical illustration.

Scientific classification
- Kingdom: Plantae
- Clade: Tracheophytes
- Clade: Angiosperms
- Clade: Eudicots
- Clade: Asterids
- Order: Asterales
- Family: Asteraceae
- Genus: Liatris
- Species: L. novae-angliae

Binomial name
- Liatris novae-angliae (Lunell) Shinners 1943

Synonyms
- Liatris borealis; Liatris scariosa var. novae-angliae

= Liatris novae-angliae =

Species of plant

Liatris novae-angliae, commonly known as the New England blazing-star, is a species of flowering plant in the family Asteraceae.

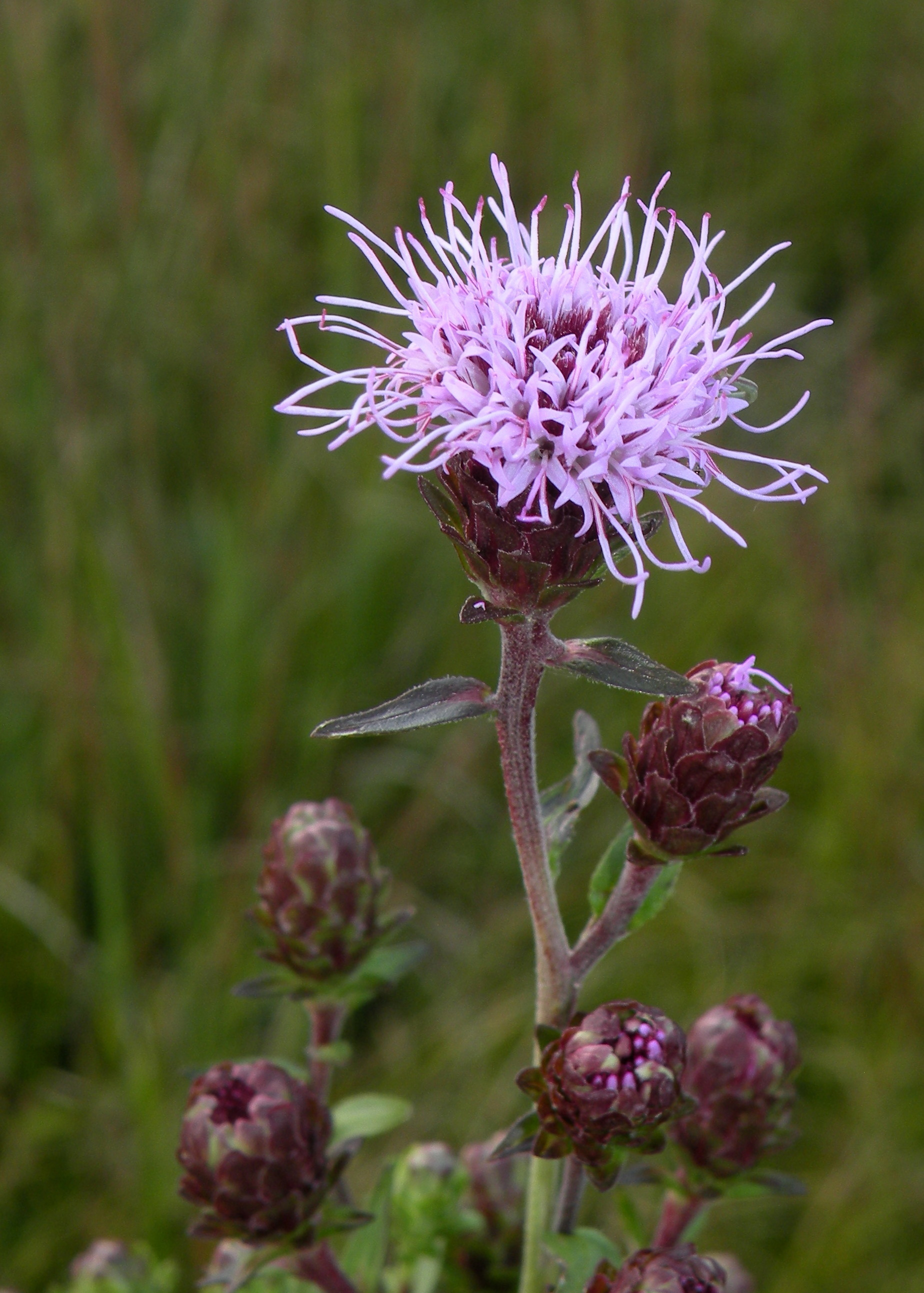
Liatris novae-angliae

== Conservation status in the United States ==
It is endangered in New Hampshire, New Jersey, and Rhode Island. It is threatened in Maine and New York. It is listed as a species of special concern in Connecticut, and in Massachusetts.
