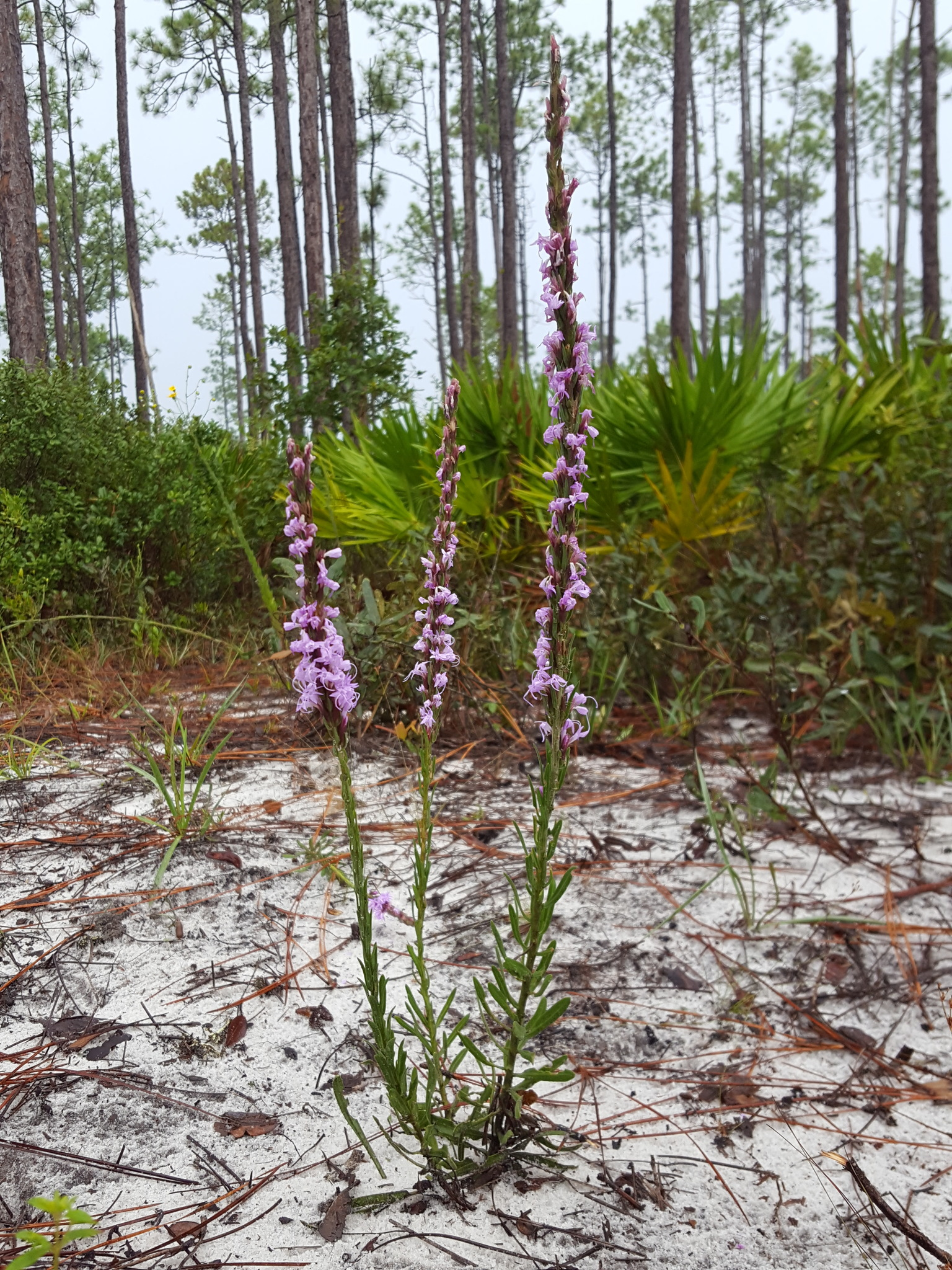

Conservation status
- Secure (NatureServe)

Scientific classification
- Kingdom: Plantae
- Clade: Tracheophytes
- Clade: Angiosperms
- Clade: Eudicots
- Clade: Asterids
- Order: Asterales
- Family: Asteraceae
- Genus: Liatris
- Species: L. chapmanii

Binomial name
- Liatris chapmanii Torr. & A.Gray

Synonyms
- Lacinaria chapmanii Kuntze; Lacinaria chapmanii var. longifolia Nash

= Liatris chapmanii =

Species of flowering plant

Liatris chapmanii, also known as Chapman's blazing star or Chapman's gayfeather, is a plant species in the family Asteraceae. It is native to Alabama, Florida and Georgia in the United States, where it is found in habitats such as dunes, beach strands, sand ridges, fields, and roadsides. It also grows in longleaf pine savannas and other scrub habitats.

== Description ==
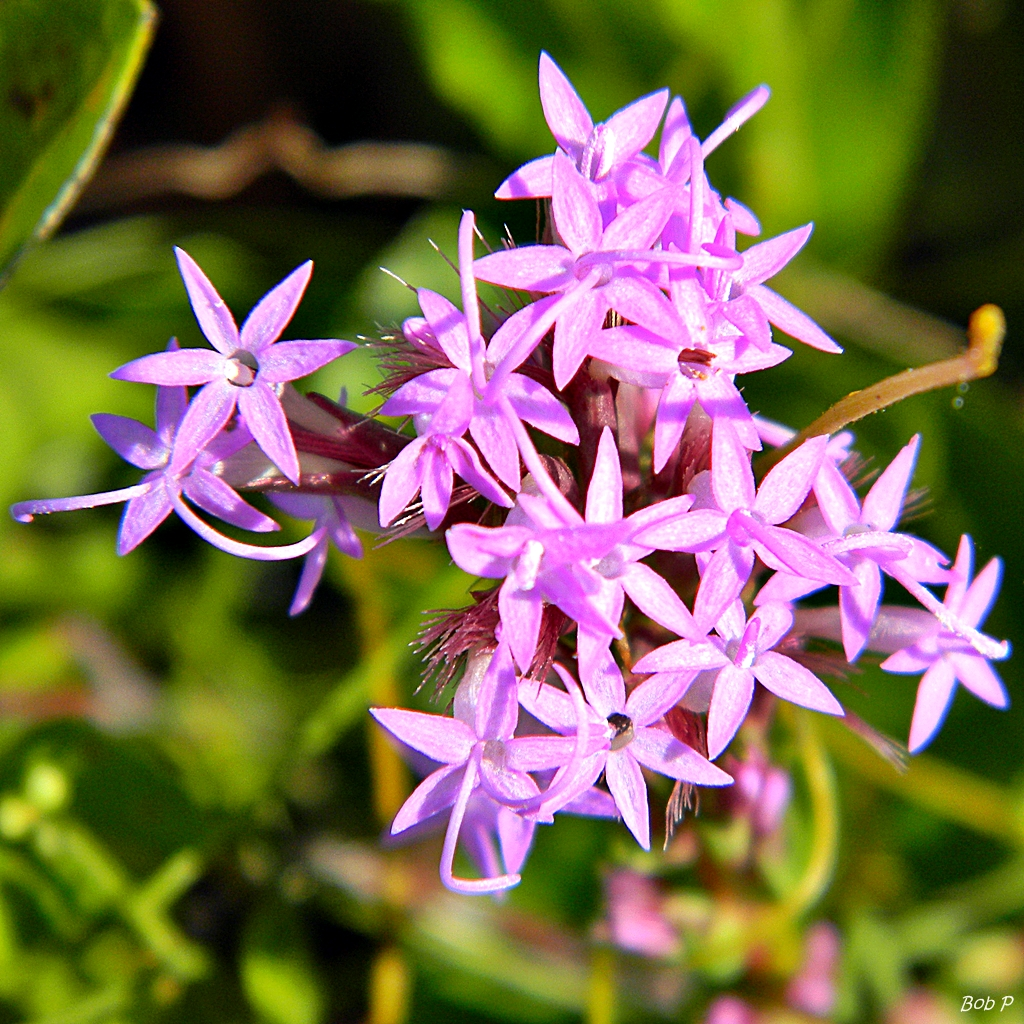

Liatris chapmanii grows from rounded to elongated corms that produce stems 35 to 75 centimeters (14 to 30 inches) tall, sometimes to 150 cm (59 in). The stems have short often ridged hairs. Plants have flowers in dense heads that are appressed against the stems, the heads have no stalks and are arranged in a dense spike-like collection. The basal and cauline leaves have one nerve and are spatulate-oblanceolate to narrowly oblanceolate in shape, they are also dotted with glands and hairless or have short stiff hairs. It flowers in August and October. The seeds are produced in cypselae (a type of fruit) that are 4 to 6 millimeters long with feathery bristle-like pappi that have minute barbs.
