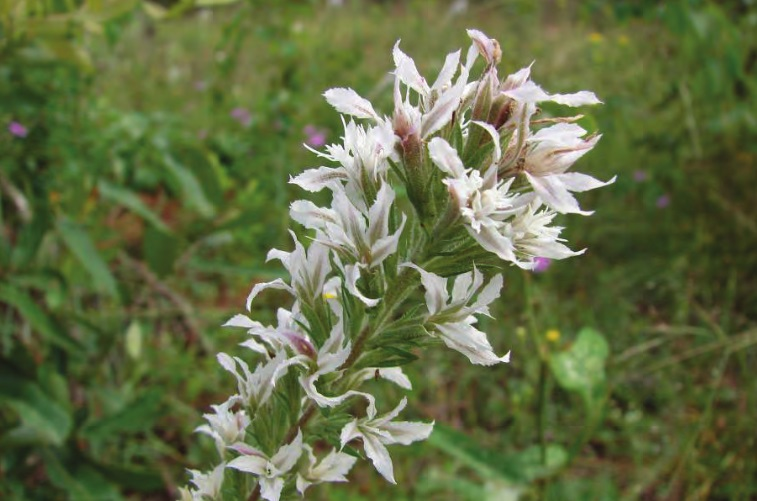

Conservation status
- Secure (NatureServe)

Scientific classification
- Kingdom: Plantae
- Clade: Tracheophytes
- Clade: Angiosperms
- Clade: Eudicots
- Clade: Asterids
- Order: Asterales
- Family: Asteraceae
- Genus: Liatris
- Species: L. elegans

Binomial name
- Liatris elegans (Walter) Michx.

Synonyms
- Staehelina elegans Walter, 1788; Calostelma elegans (Walter) D.Don in Sweet, 1833

= Liatris elegans =

Species of flowering plant

Liatris elegans, known commonly as pinkscale gayfeather, pinkscale blazingstar, and elegant blazingstar, is a species of flowering plant in the family Asteraceae. It is native to the southeastern United States as far west as Texas and Oklahoma.

== Description ==
Liatris elegans grows from rounded or turnip-shaped corms, that produce stems 30 to 120 centimeters tall. The upright growing stems generally have soft hairs but sometimes plants have coarse stiff hairs. The basal and cauline leaves have one nerve, and the leaves are long and thin, ranging from 6 to 20+ centimeters long and 3 to 8 millimeters wide. The foliage is mostly hairless but may have some soft hairs, and it is gland-dotted. The leaves are gradually reduced in size as they ascend the stem or abruptly reduced near the middle of the stem; the basal and lower stem leaves typically wither away before flowering. The flowers are in heads with 4 or 5 florets and maybe pink, purplish, white, or yellow in color. The heads are produced in densely packed spike-like terminal inflorescences. The seed are produced in cypselae fruits that are 3.5 to 5 millimeters long with feathery bristles.

== Distribution and habitat ==
It grows in dry, sandy soils in prairie and pineland habitat.

== Taxonomy ==
There are four varieties:

- Liatris elegans var. bridgesii Mayfield
- Liatris elegans var. carizzana Gaiser
- Liatris elegans var. elegans (Walter) Michx.
- Liatris elegans var. kralii Mayfield
