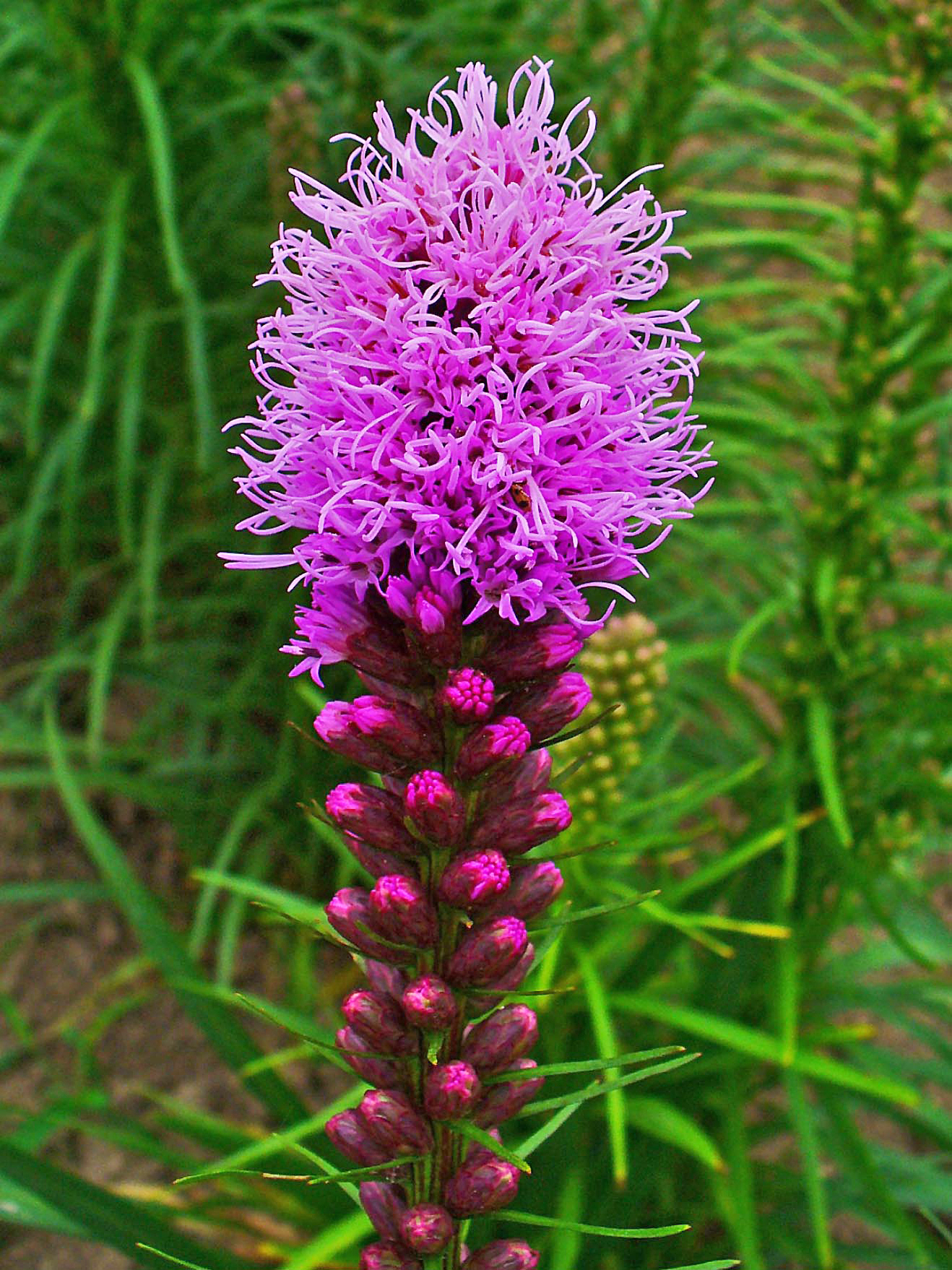

Conservation status
- Secure (NatureServe)

Scientific classification
- Kingdom: Plantae
- Clade: Embryophytes
- Clade: Tracheophytes
- Clade: Angiosperms
- Clade: Eudicots
- Clade: Asterids
- Order: Asterales
- Family: Asteraceae
- Genus: Liatris
- Species: L. spicata

Binomial name
- Liatris spicata (L.) Willd.

= Liatris spicata =

Species of flowering plant in the daisy family

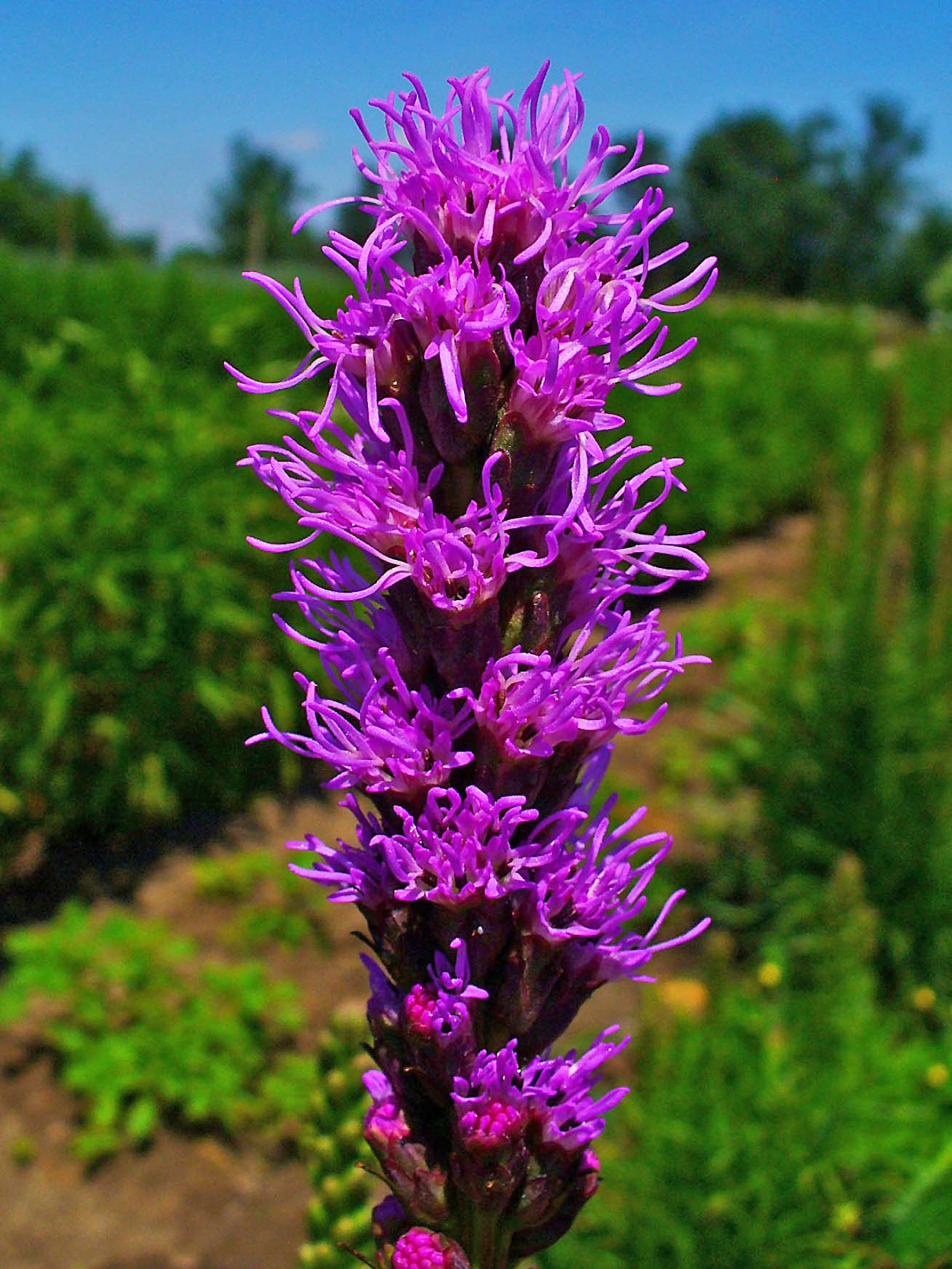

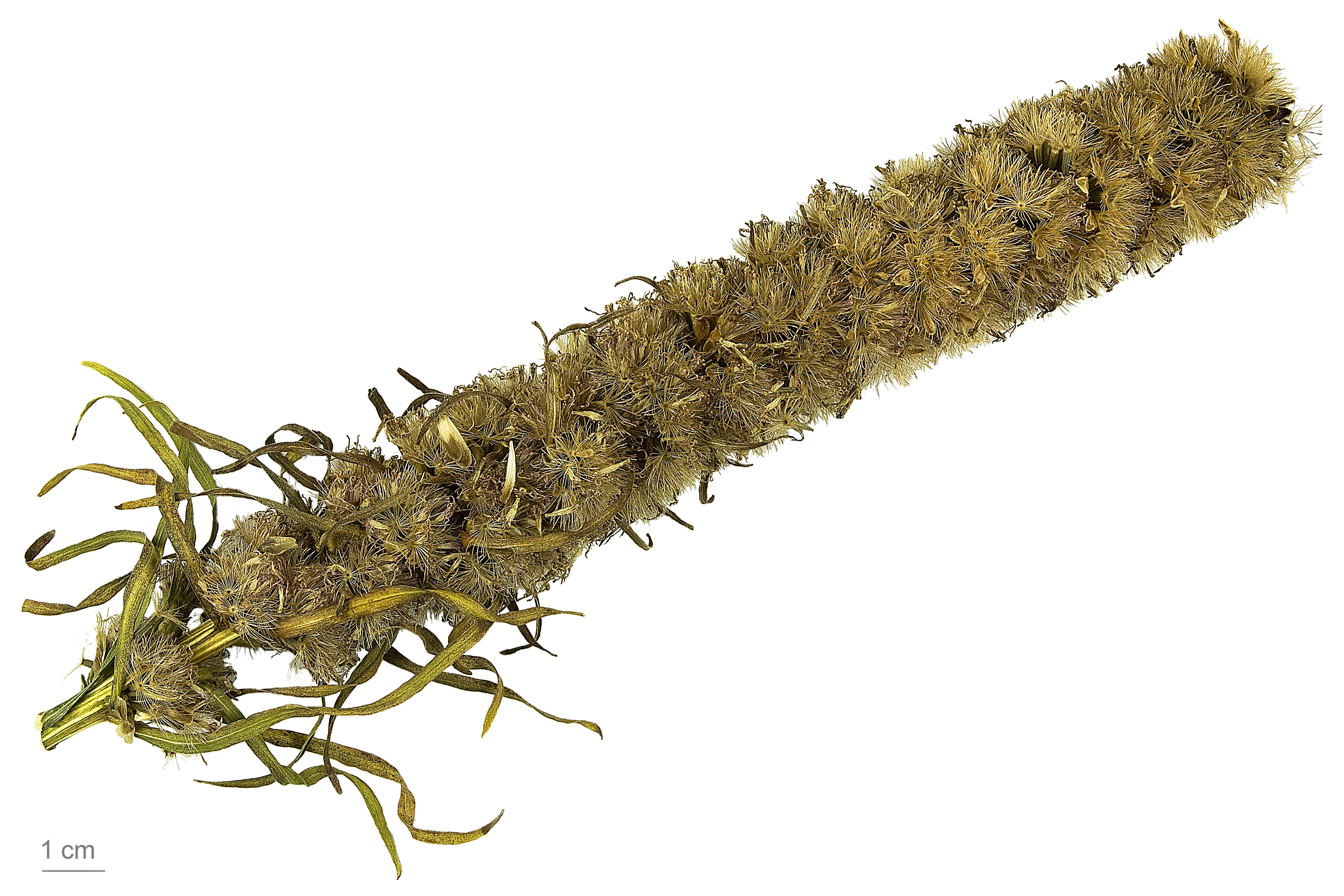
Dried flower head of Liatris spicata - MHNT

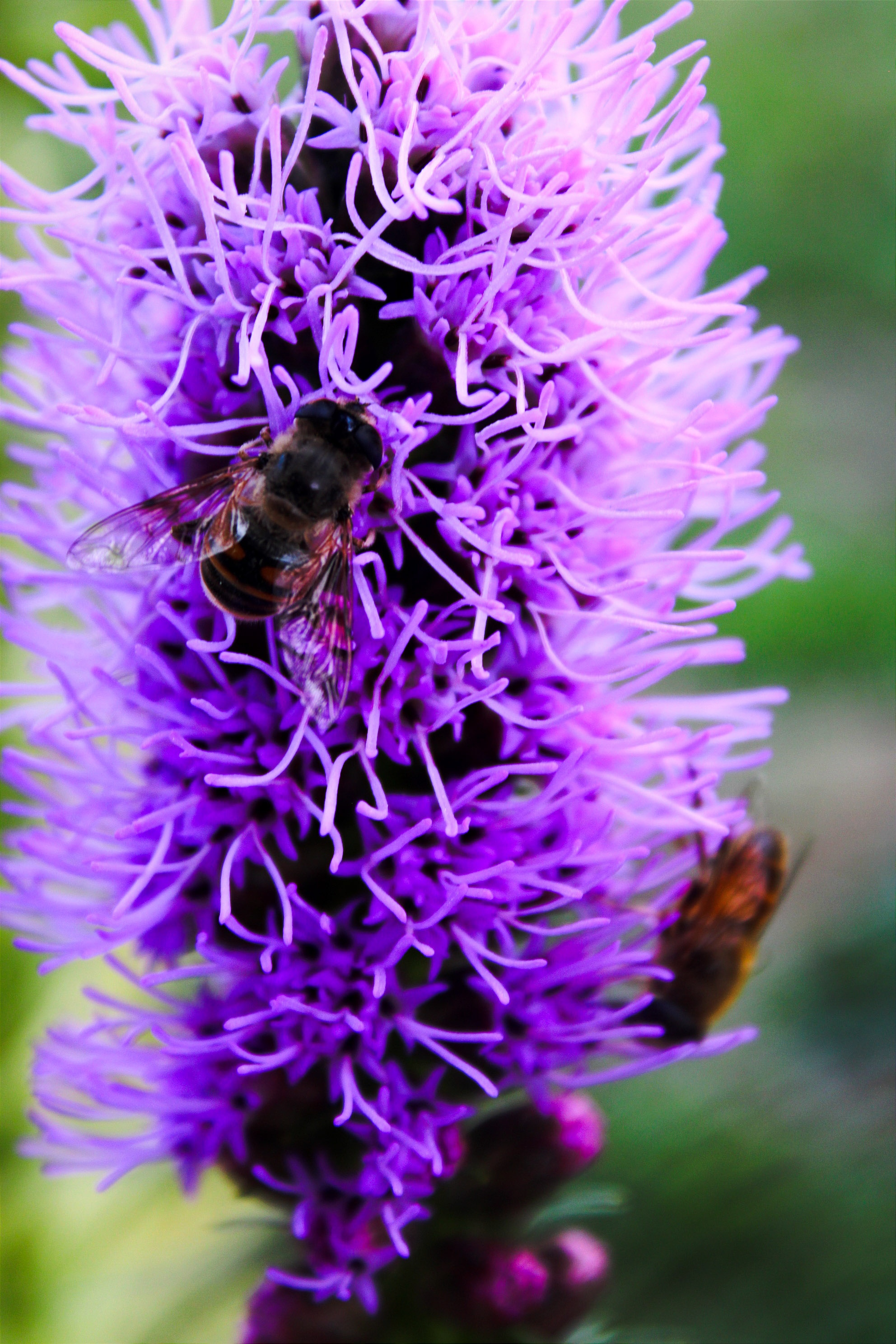
Liatris spicata

Liatris spicata, the dense blazing star, prairie feather, gayfeather or button snakewort, is a herbaceous perennial flowering plant in the family Asteraceae. It is native to eastern North America where it grows in moist prairies and meadows.

The plants have tall spikes of purple flowers resembling bottle brushes or feathers that grow 1–5 ft (0.30–1.52 m) tall. The species grows in hardiness zones 3–8, stretching from the Midwest to the East Coast, eastern and western Canada.

Common varieties include 'Alba' and 'Floristan White' which are white-flowering cultivars on 18 in (46 cm) tall spikes, 'Callilepsis' with long stems good for cut flowers, 'Floristan Violett' with a strong stem and thick, violet flower spikes preferred by florists, and 'Kobold' which stays small in size with deep purple flowers.

Liatris spicata var. resinosa is found in the southern part of the species's natural range. The variable plants have only 5 or 6 flowers per head and the heads are more widely spaced on the stems; these differences are more pronounced when the plants are found in drier and coastal habitats.

== Cultivation ==
Liatris spicata is a garden flower in many countries around the world, grown for its showy purple flowers (pink or white in some cultivars). They bloom in July through August or September, depending on where in their range they are located.

Under cultivation it is found under many names including button snakewort, Kansas gay feather, blazing star, Liatris callilepis.

Full sun is best and well-drained soil is preferred to prevent rot, though the plants do prefer moist soil. However, the plants do not tolerate wet soil in winter. The plants can tolerant some shade as well as drought but need regular watering during the first growing season to build strong roots.

Plants can be grown from corms (similar to bulbs and tubers) or from seed, or the plants can be bought at garden centres or nurseries.

To grow from seed, start in early spring either indoors or outside. Germination takes 20–45 days. When leaves appear, divide in large clumps. Plants should be spaced 12-15 inches apart. Spacing allows sun and air to help with potential diseases such as stem rot (Sclerotinia sclerotiorum), leaf spots (Phyllosticta liatridis, Septoria liatridis), rusts (Coleosporium laciniariae, Puccinia liatridis), powdery mildew (Golovinomyces ambrosiae complex), and wilt (Verticillium albo-atrum). When growing from seed, blooms do not usually appear until the second year.

If amending the soil, the plants prefer soil with high levels of calcium and magnesium and low levels of potassium and phosphorus.

In gardens, Liatris spicata works well planted individually, as a border, and because of its vertical form, it contrasts well with mounded and broad-leaf plants. In informal gardens, large sweeps of plantings work well.

The flowers either fresh or dried work well as cut flowers and have a vanilla scent when dried.

== Role in ecosystems ==
Liatris spicata is excellent for attracting pollinators and beneficial insects. These include butterflies such as the monarch, tiger swallowtail, clouded sulphur, orange sulphur, gray hairstreak, Aphrodite fritillary, painted lady, red admiral, and wood nymphs. The flowers attract bumblebees, digger bees (Anthophorini), long-horned bees (Melissodes spp.), leaf-cutting bees (Megachile spp.), skippers, and birds including hummingbirds. Caterpillars of the rare glorious flower moth (Schinia gloriosa) and liatris flower moth (Schinia sanguinea) feed on the flowers and seeds. Caterpillars of the liatris borer moth (Carmenta anthracipennis) bore through the plant's stems. Groundhogs, rabbits, and voles will also eat the plants.

Deer are less likely to eat Liatris spicata than other plants and is therefore considered deer-resistant, although deer will eat almost anything when food is scarce.

== Medicinal uses ==
Liatris spicata was historically used medicinally by Native Americans as a carminative, diuretic, stimulant and expectorant herb. In addition to these uses, the Cherokee used the plant as an analgesic for pain in the back and limbs and the Menominee used it for heart issues. The root/corm of the plant is the part most often used. Native Americans also used the plant to treat swelling, abdominal pain and spasms/colic, and snake bites. Currently, the plant is used for a sore throat by gargling an infusion, as an herbal insect repellent, and in potpourri.
