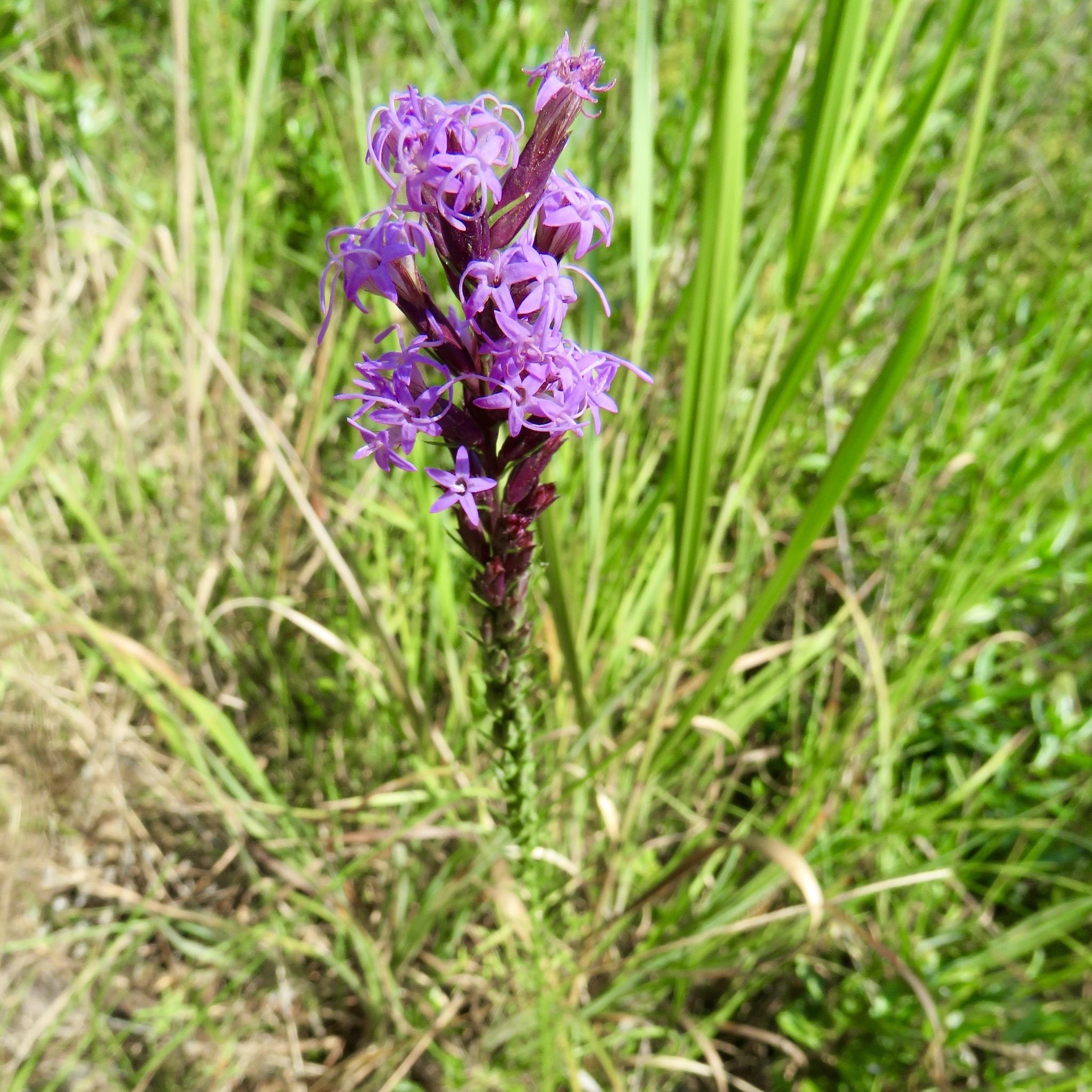

Conservation status
- Apparently Secure (NatureServe)

Scientific classification
- Kingdom: Plantae
- Clade: Tracheophytes
- Clade: Angiosperms
- Clade: Eudicots
- Clade: Asterids
- Order: Asterales
- Family: Asteraceae
- Genus: Liatris
- Species: L. acidota

Binomial name
- Liatris acidota Engelmann & A. Gray

= Liatris acidota =

Species of flowering plant

Liatris acidota, also known as the Gulf Coast gayfeather, sharp blazing star and sharp gayfeather, is a plant species in the family Asteraceae and genus Liatris. It is native to Louisiana and Texas in the United States, where it is found in habitats that include coastal prairies, dry prairie and savanna, where it is found in sandy to clay soils.

L. acidota grows from rounded to elongated corms that produce hairless stems 20–90 centimeters tall, with some plants growing as tall 130 centimeters. Plants have purple colored flowers in dense heads forming a spike-like collection along the stems. It flowers from June through October. The seed are produced in cypselae fruits that are 4 to 4.5 millimeters long.
