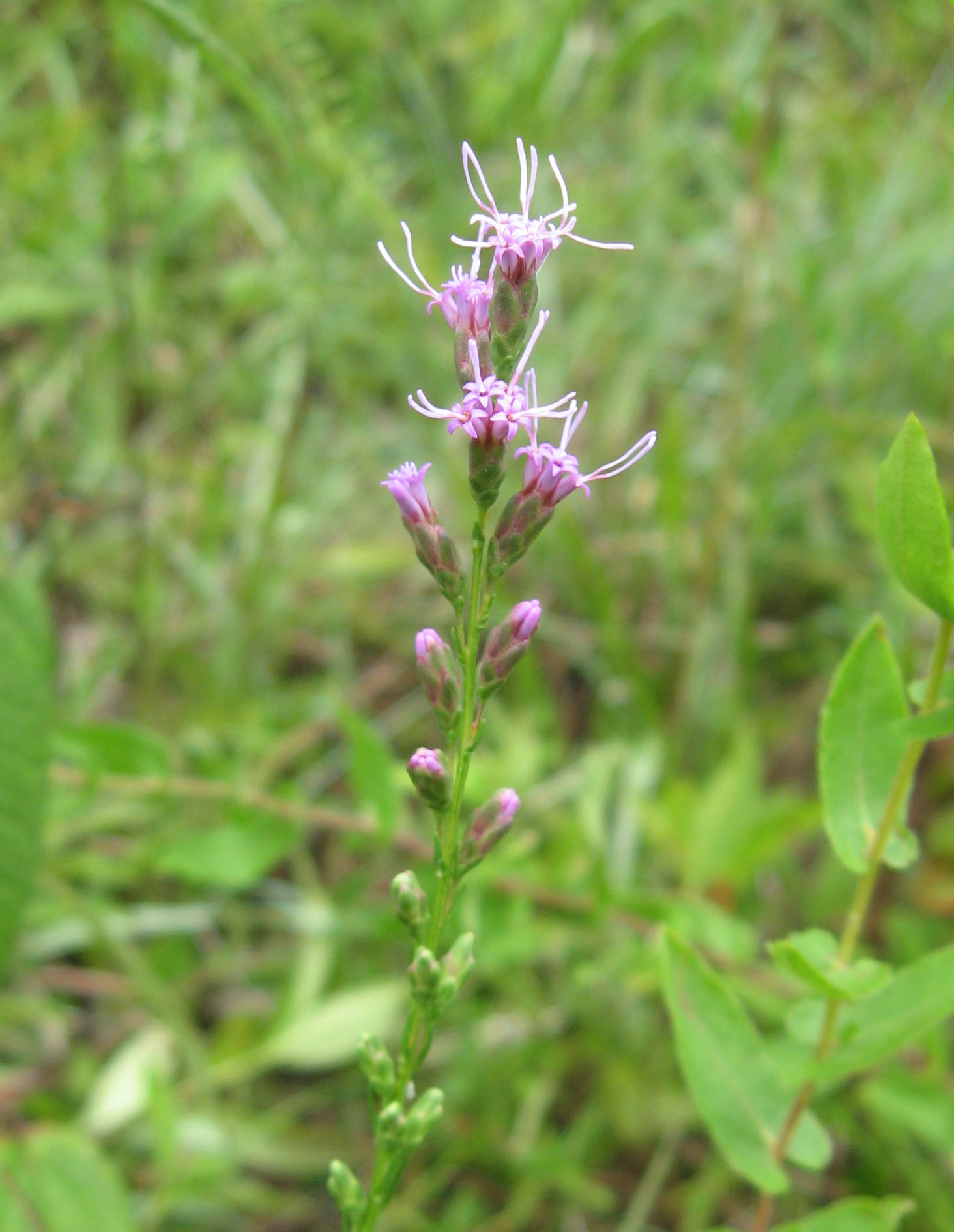

Conservation status
- Vulnerable (NatureServe)

Scientific classification
- Kingdom: Plantae
- Clade: Tracheophytes
- Clade: Angiosperms
- Clade: Eudicots
- Clade: Asterids
- Order: Asterales
- Family: Asteraceae
- Genus: Liatris
- Species: L. microcephala

Binomial name
- Liatris microcephala (Small) K. Schumann

= Liatris microcephala =

Species of flowering plant

Liatris microcephala, known by the common names smallhead blazing star and smallhead gayfeather, is a species of flowering plant in the family Asteraceae. It is native to the Southeastern United States, primarily to regions of the Cumberland Plateau and Piedmont. The leaves of this plant are narrow and grass-like. It is found growing on exposed acidic rock such as sandstone or granite, as well as in open sandy areas. It is a perennial and flowers in late summer.
