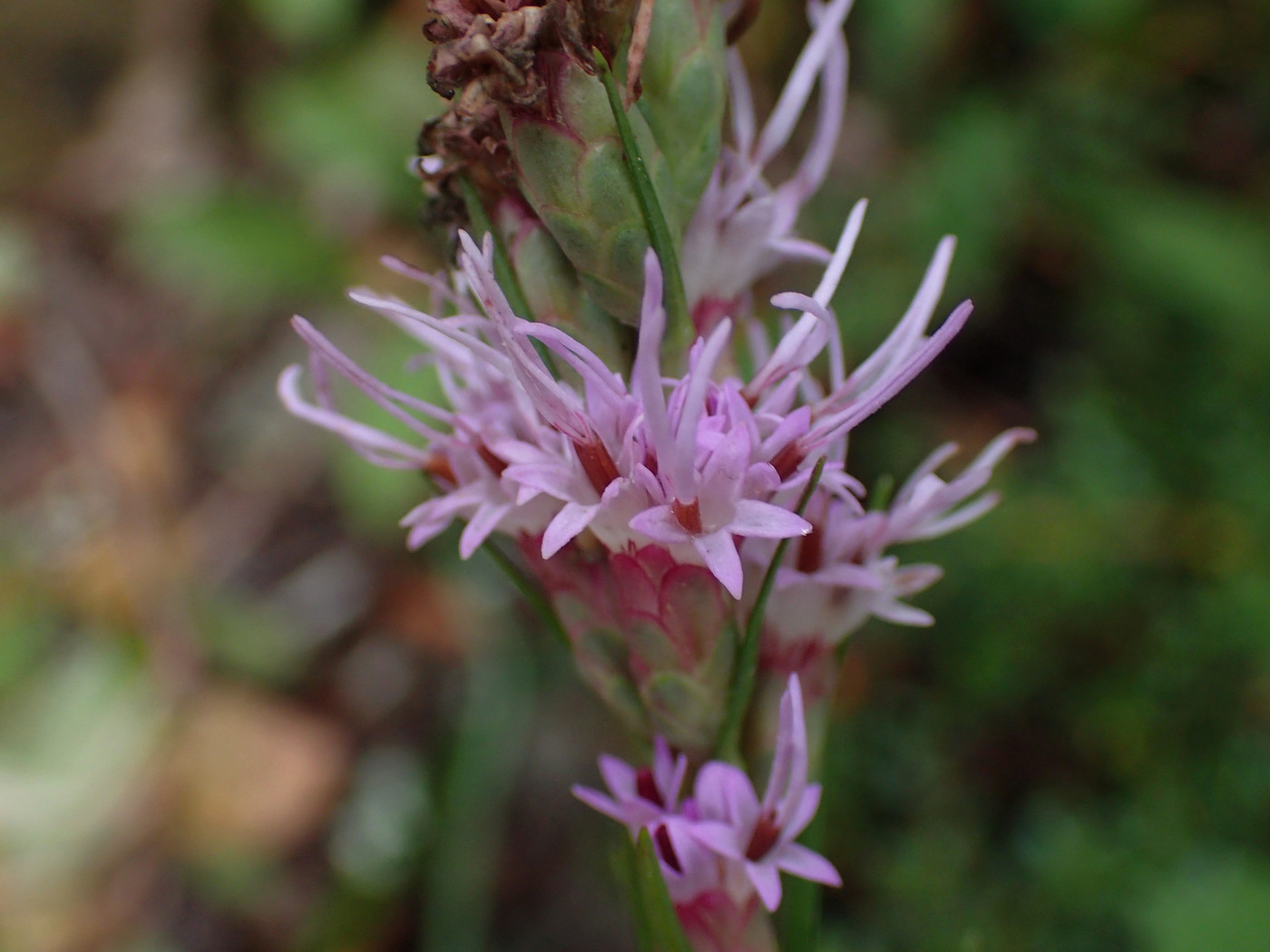

Conservation status
- Imperiled (NatureServe)

- Threatened (ESA)

Scientific classification
- Kingdom: Plantae
- Clade: Tracheophytes
- Clade: Angiosperms
- Clade: Eudicots
- Clade: Asterids
- Order: Asterales
- Family: Asteraceae
- Genus: Liatris
- Species: L. helleri

Binomial name
- Liatris helleri Porter

Synonyms
- Lacinaria helleri (Porter) Porter; Liatris turgida Gaiser

= Liatris helleri =

Species of flowering plant

Liatris helleri is a species of flowering plants in the family Asteraceae known by the common names Heller's blazing star and Heller's gayfeather. It is native to the Appalachian Mountains of the southeastern United States, found in the states of North Carolina, Virginia, West Virginia, and Maryland. It is threatened by recreational activities in its habitat, and is federally listed as a threatened species.

Liatris helleri is a perennial herb which grows up to about half a meter (20 inches) in height from a spherical corm. The leaves are variable in shape, from linear to lance-shaped, and about 5 to 22 centimetres (2.0 to 8.7 in) in length, with the largest ones located at the base and much smaller ones higher on the stem. The inflorescence is a spike-like array of numerous flower heads. The flower heads have purplish bell-shaped involucres containing 7–13(–17 lighter purple disc flowers but no ray flowers. Blooming occurs from July to September. The fruit is an achene with a pappus of varying lengths, but generally shorter than those of other Liatris.

A 2005 study expanded the species description of Liatris helleri to include plants with certain similarities. Populations of plants growing in West Virginia and Virginia previously included in another species (Liatris turgida) might now be included within the circumscription of L. helleri. In that case it would be less rare and no longer a true North Carolina endemic.

Liatris helleri was added to the American endangered species list with a threatened status in 1987. It was only known to grow on cliffs on the summits of the northern Blue Ridge Mountains. These areas were heavily used for recreational activities such as hiking and skiing, or were in danger of being altered during the development of utilities such as parking lots and bridges. In 1987, there were only seven known populations of the plant; an eighth was discovered by 2000. The estimated global population of Liatris helleri is only 3,000 individuals, although more have been grown in greenhouses for planting in appropriate habitats.
