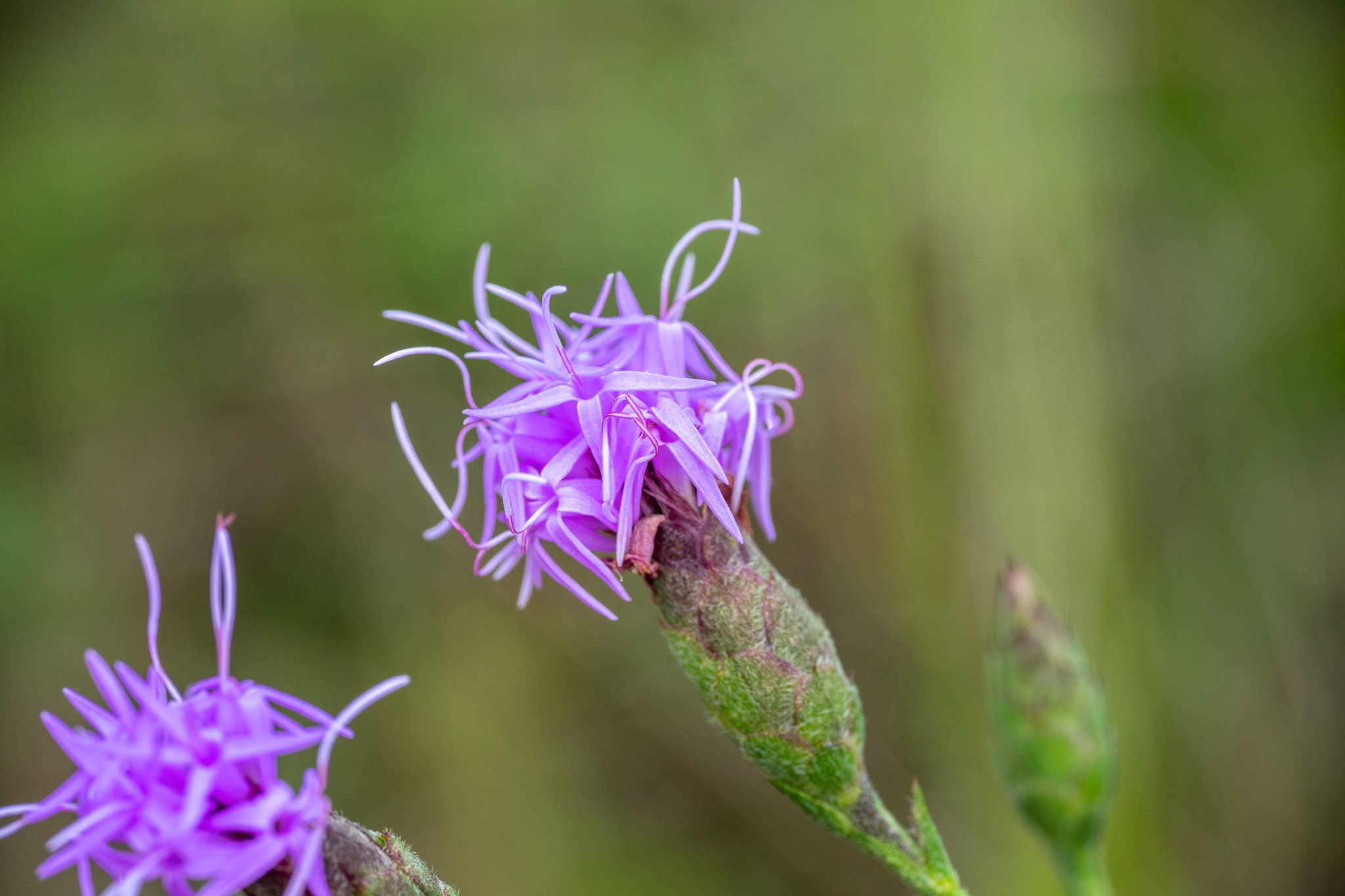

Conservation status
- Imperiled (NatureServe)

Scientific classification
- Kingdom: Plantae
- Clade: Tracheophytes
- Clade: Angiosperms
- Clade: Eudicots
- Clade: Asterids
- Order: Asterales
- Family: Asteraceae
- Genus: Liatris
- Species: L. cymosa

Binomial name
- Liatris cymosa (Ness) K. Schum.

Synonyms
- Lacinaria cymosa Ness

= Liatris cymosa =

Species of flowering plant

Liatris cymosa (also known as Aggie-land gayfeather, branched gayfeather, or branched blazing star) is a plant species in the family Asteraceae and genus Liatris. It is native to east central Texas in North America, where it is found in habitats such as post oak woodlands, fields, fence rows, woodland openings and edges, in clay soils. It blooms in mid to late summer with purple flower heads. It is of conservation concern due to habitat loss.

== Description ==
Liatris cymosa grows from rounded or sometimes elongated corms, that produce stems 20 to 75 centimeters tall. The upright growing stems have appressed hairs that point in the same direction. The basal and cauline leaves have one nerve. The leaves are long and thin, ranging from 8 to 12 centimeters long and 2 to 5 millimeters wide. The foliage is mostly hairless or may have some hairs on the margins; the leaves are gradually reduced in size as they ascend the stem or abruptly reduced halfway up the stem. The flowers are in dense heads with 20 to 25 florets, and the heads have stems that are 20 to 70 millimeters long. The heads are produced in loose cyme-like clusters of 2 to 20, sometimes more, terminating the widely branched stems. The seed is produced in a cypselae (a type of fruit) that is 6 to 7 millimeters long with feathery pappi.

== Habitat ==
Liatris cymosa is native to Texas and is found growing in grasslands, in open post oak woodlands, in fields, in fencerows, and other open areas and edges; it grows in clay, chalky, and gravel soils. It is of conservation concern, and populations have been lost do to development.
