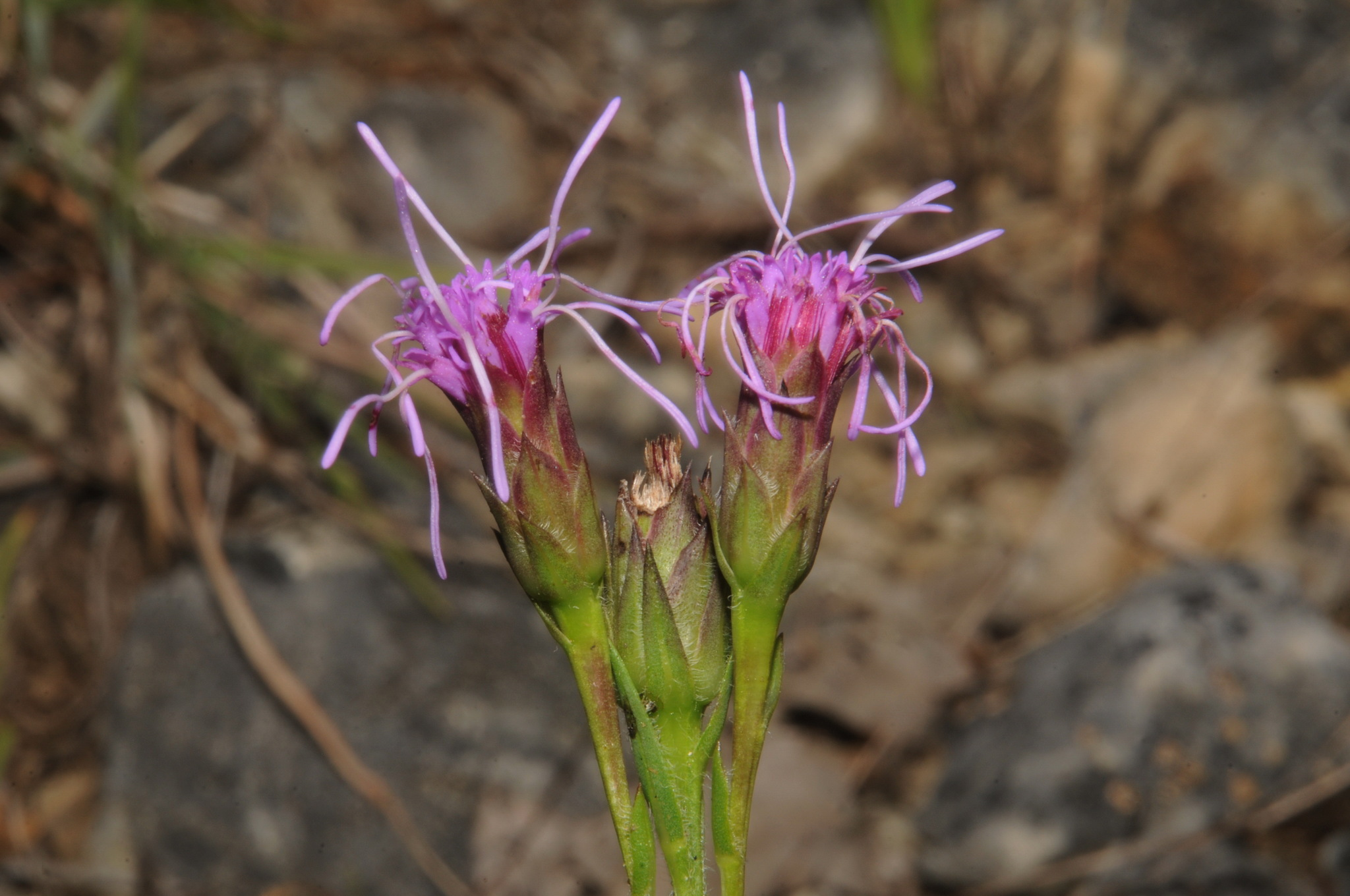

Conservation status
- Critically Imperiled (NatureServe)

Scientific classification
- Kingdom: Plantae
- Clade: Tracheophytes
- Clade: Angiosperms
- Clade: Eudicots
- Clade: Asterids
- Order: Asterales
- Family: Asteraceae
- Genus: Liatris
- Species: L. oligocephala

Binomial name
- Liatris oligocephala J.R.Allison

= Liatris oligocephala =

Species of flowering plant

Liatris oligocephala, the Cahaba torch, is a flowering plant in the genus Liatris (blazing stars). Its native range is very small, with all known populations being within Bibb County, Alabama, and therefore the species is of conservation concern. It hybridizes with the much more common Liatris cylindracea, but the offspring do not appear to cross with L. oligocephala.
