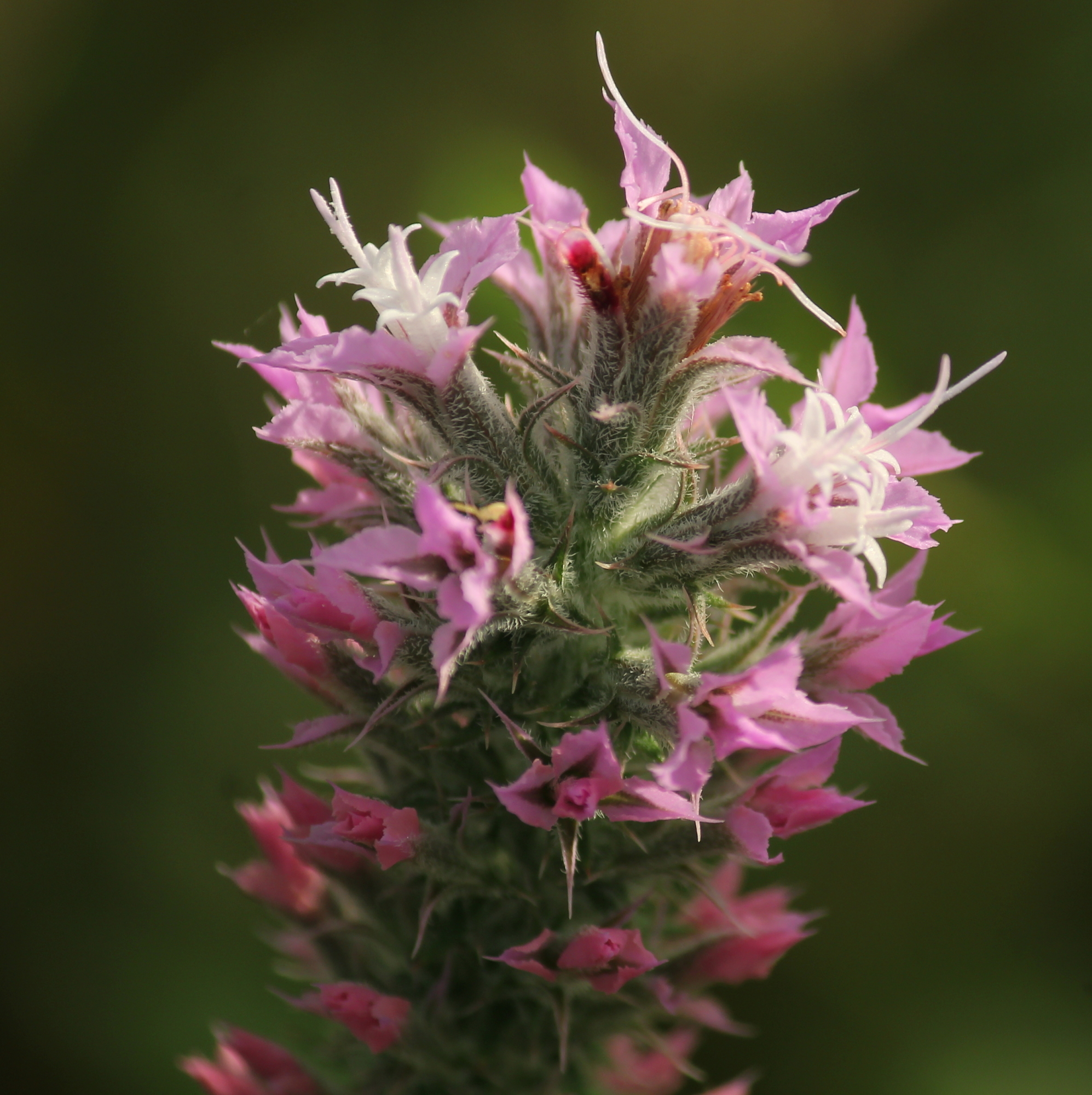

Scientific classification
- Kingdom: Plantae
- Clade: Tracheophytes
- Clade: Angiosperms
- Clade: Eudicots
- Clade: Asterids
- Order: Asterales
- Family: Asteraceae
- Genus: Liatris
- Species: L. hesperelegans

Binomial name
- Liatris hesperelegans G.L.Nesom

= Liatris hesperelegans =

Species of flowering plant

Liatris hesperelegans is a species of plant commonly known as pink-scale blazing star.

It is native to south-eastern parts of the United States.
