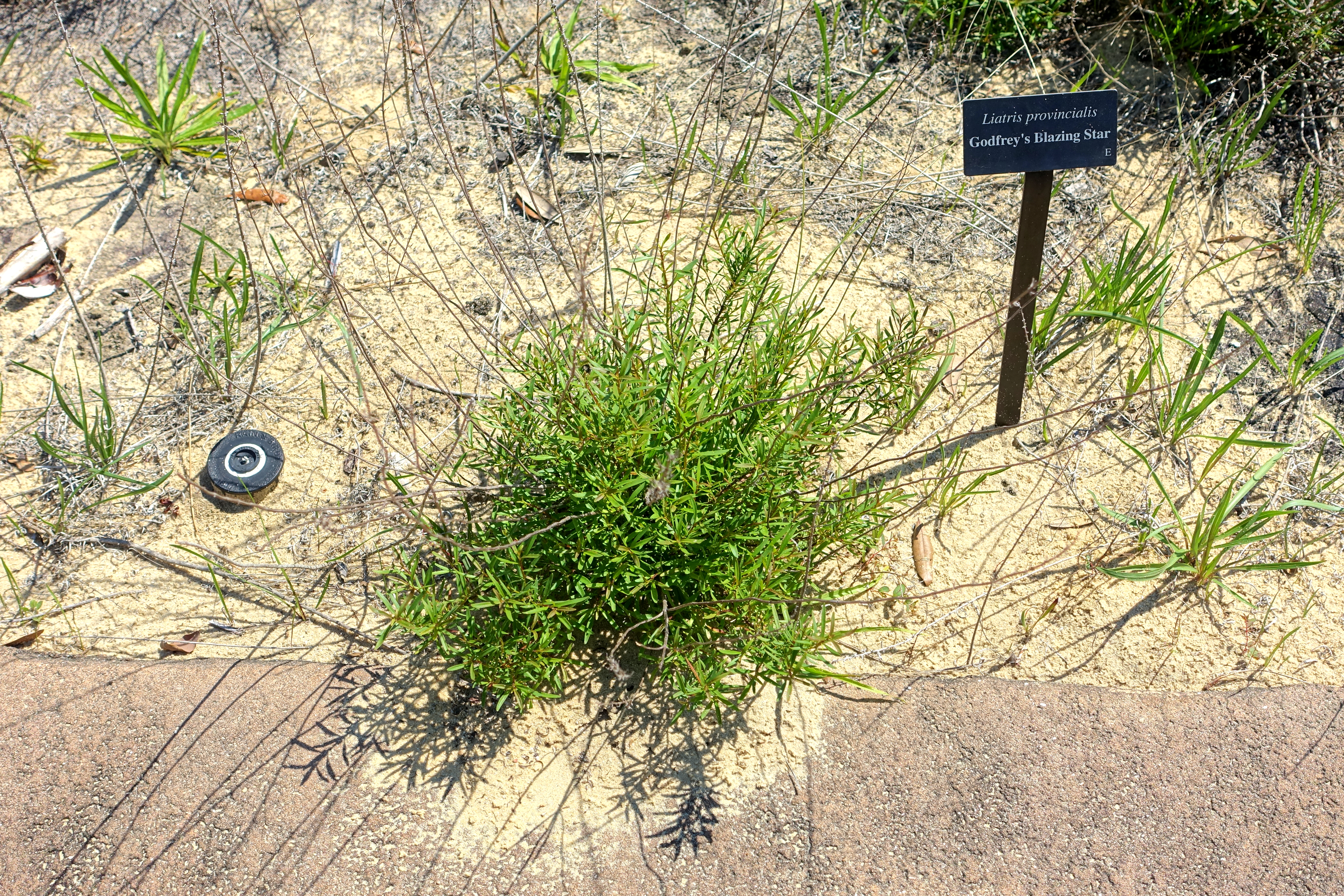

Conservation status
- Imperiled (NatureServe)

Scientific classification
- Kingdom: Plantae
- Clade: Embryophytes
- Clade: Tracheophytes
- Clade: Angiosperms
- Clade: Eudicots
- Clade: Asterids
- Order: Asterales
- Family: Asteraceae
- Genus: Liatris
- Species: L. provincialis

Binomial name
- Liatris provincialis Godfrey

= Liatris provincialis =

Species of flowering plant

Liatris provincialis is a species of flowering plant in the family Asteraceae called Godfrey's blazing star or Godfrey's gayflower. It is endemic to Florida in the United States, where it is limited to Wakulla and Franklin Counties in the Panhandle.

This perennial herb grows from a corm and reaches up to 90 centimeters tall. The leaves are linear to lance-shaped and up to 15 centimeters long near the base of the stem, becoming much smaller and narrower higher up the stem. The flower heads are arranged in a dense, spikelike array. The head is cylindrical and about a centimeter long. It is held at a right angle to the stem and is attached to it, without a stalk. It contains three or four purple disc florets and no ray florets. The flowers bloom in August and September, sometimes into October.

This plant grows in coastal habitats, generally in scrub and sandhills. The habitat is prone to disturbance, and requires it to maintain open space. Without disturbance, which often comes in the form of wildfire, the pines overgrow, closing the woods and eliminating open space. When this overgrowth occurs, the plant only grows in artificially maintained open spaces, such as firebreaks.

There are 54 known populations of this plant, several of which are within St. Marks National Wildlife Refuge. Some populations have occurred in clear-cut areas in privately owned stands of timber.

This species is threatened by the loss of its habitat to intensive coastal development and the degradation of its habitat by the loss of natural regimes of disturbance, by fire suppression, for example.
