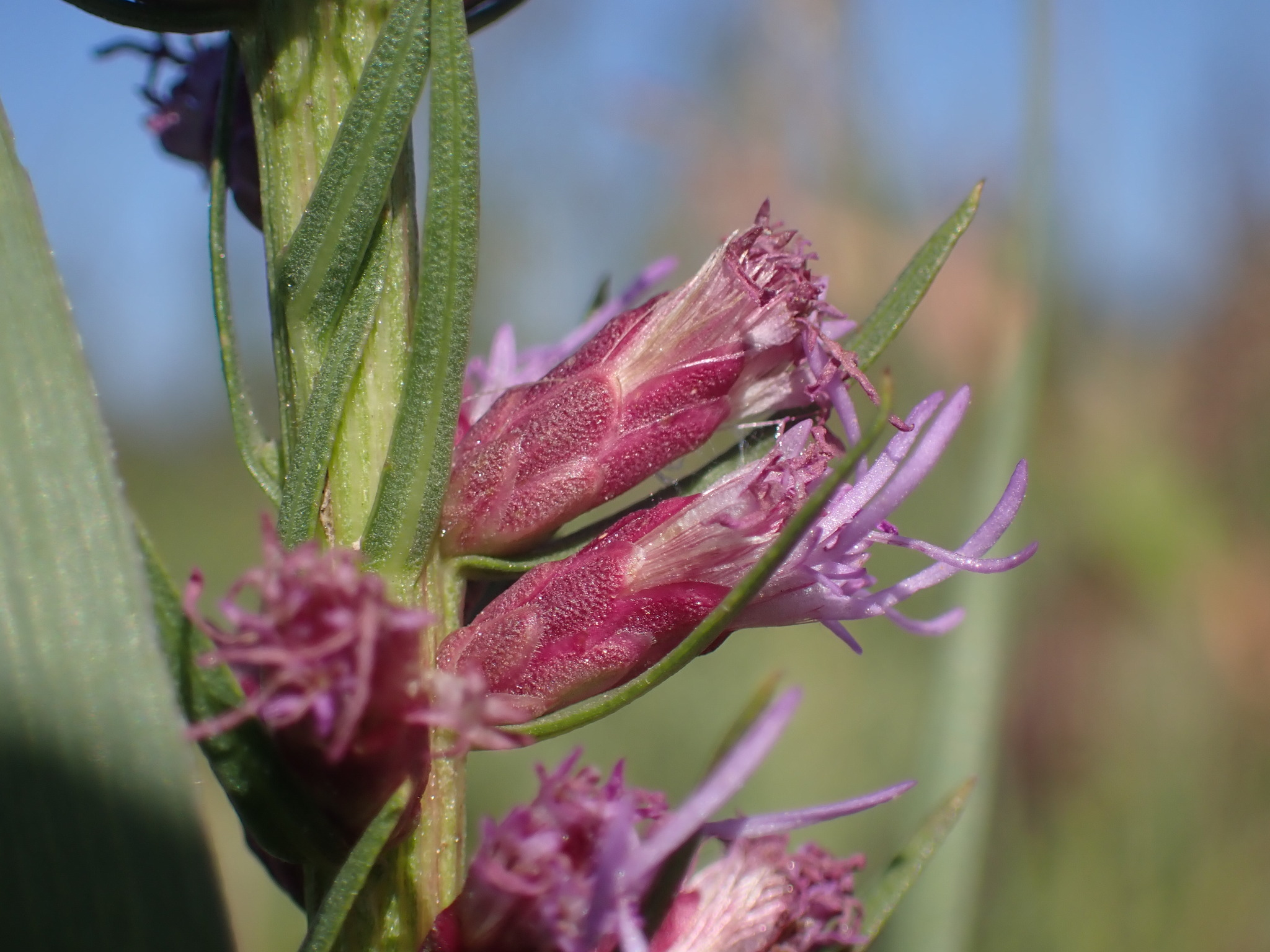

Conservation status
- Apparently Secure (NatureServe)

Scientific classification
- Kingdom: Plantae
- Clade: Tracheophytes
- Clade: Angiosperms
- Clade: Eudicots
- Clade: Asterids
- Order: Asterales
- Family: Asteraceae
- Genus: Liatris
- Species: L. lancifolia

Binomial name
- Liatris lancifolia (Greene) Kittell

Synonyms
- Lacinaria kansana Britton; Lacinaria lancifolia Greene; Liatris kansana (Britton) Rydb.; Liatris kansana Britton

= Liatris lancifolia =

Species of flowering plant

Liatris lancifolia is a species of flowering plants in the family Asteraceae native to the prairies of central and western North America, known by the common names lanceleaf blazing star and Great Plains gayfeather.
