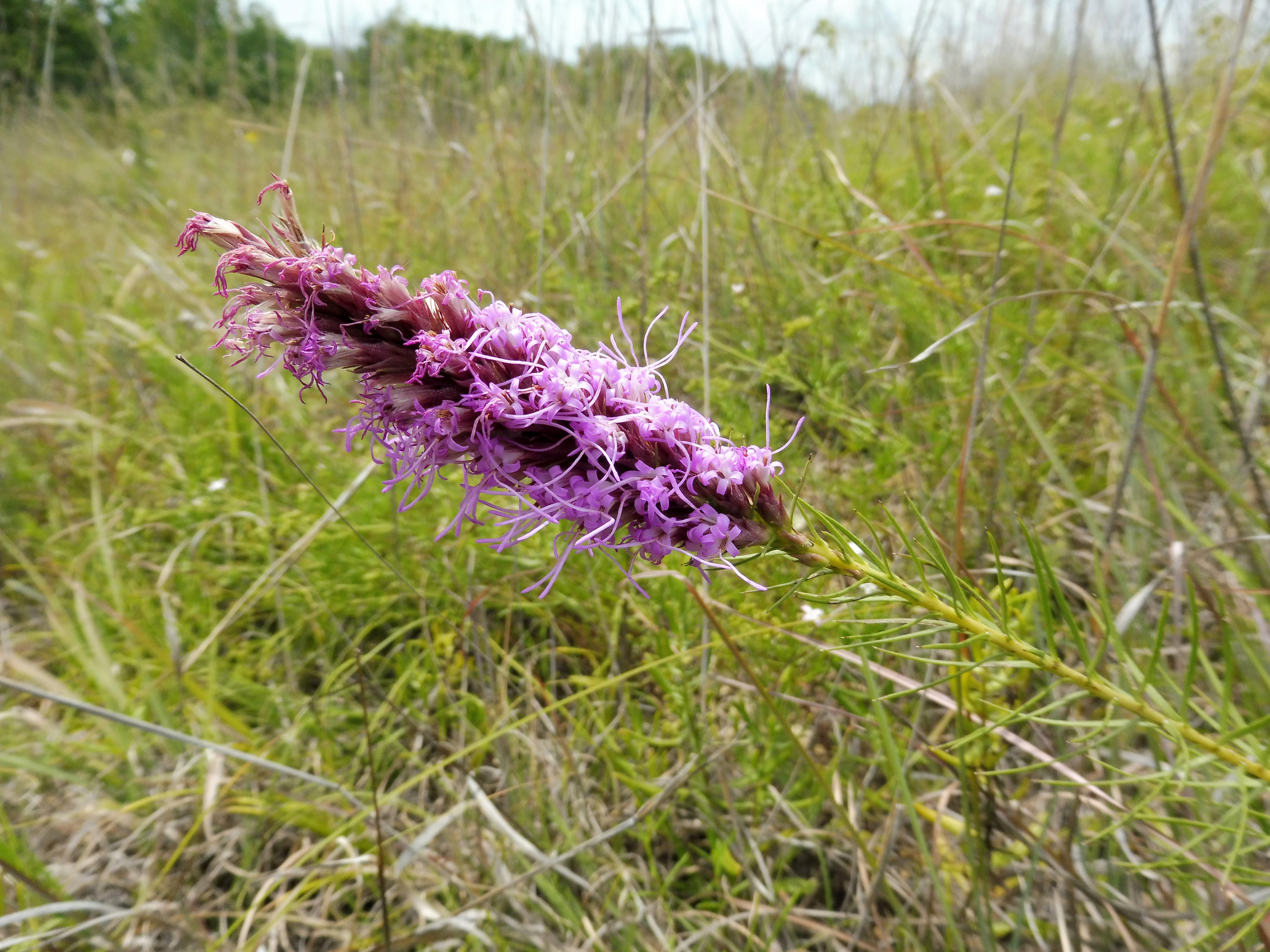

Conservation status
- Vulnerable (NatureServe)

Scientific classification
- Kingdom: Plantae
- Clade: Tracheophytes
- Clade: Angiosperms
- Clade: Eudicots
- Clade: Asterids
- Order: Asterales
- Family: Asteraceae
- Genus: Liatris
- Species: L. aestivalis

Binomial name
- Liatris aestivalis G.L.Nesom & O'Kennon

= Liatris aestivalis =

Species of plant

Liatris aestivalis, also known as the summer gayfeather, is a plant species in the family Asteraceae and genus Liatris. The specific epithet, aestivalis, is derived from Latin and means "pertaining to the summer".

== Description ==
It grows from rounded corms that produce hairless stems 20 to 65 centimeters tall. Plants have dark-purple colored flowers in dense heads that are closely grouped together, forming a cylindrical-shaped spike-like collection surrounding the stems. The basal and cauline leaves have one nerve and are linear to linear-lanceolate in shape. It flowers in July and August, sometimes into September. The seed are produced in cypselae fruits that are 4.5 to 6 millimeters long with feathery bristle-like pappi.

== Distribution ==
It is native to Oklahoma and Texas in the United States, where it is found in habitats that range from limestone outcrops to slopes and bases of slopes with shallow soils.
