= Schinia carmosina =

Scientific classification
- Domain: Eukaryota
- Kingdom: Animalia
- Phylum: Arthropoda
- Class: Insecta
- Order: Lepidoptera
- Superfamily: Noctuoidea
- Family: Noctuidae
- Genus: Schinia
- Species: S. carmosina

Binomial name
- Schinia carmosina Neumoegen, 1883

Species of moth

The Maroon Washed Flower Moth (Schinia carmosina) is a moth of the family Noctuidae. It is found in central Florida.

It was formerly considered a synonym of Schinia sanguinea.

The wingspan is about 28 mm. There is one generation per year.

The larvae feed on Carphephorus corymbosus and Garberia heterophylla.
