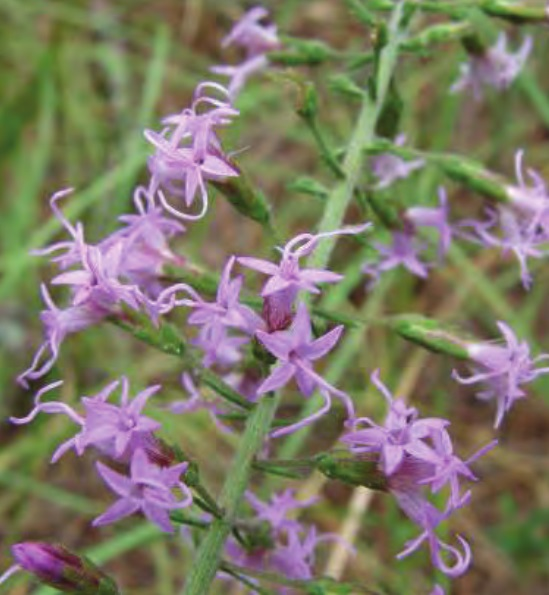
- Close-up of flowers

Conservation status
- Secure (NatureServe)

Scientific classification
- Kingdom: Plantae
- Clade: Embryophytes
- Clade: Tracheophytes
- Clade: Spermatophytes
- Clade: Angiosperms
- Clade: Eudicots
- Clade: Asterids
- Order: Asterales
- Family: Asteraceae
- Genus: Liatris
- Species: L. gracilis

Binomial name
- Liatris gracilis Pursh

Synonyms
- List: Lacinaria gracilis Kuntze; Lacinaria laxa Small; Liatris gholsonii L.C.Anderson; Liatris lanceolata Bertol.; Liatris laxa K.Schum.; Liatris pauciflosculosa Nutt.; Liatris pilosa var. gracilis (Pursh) Nutt.

= Liatris gracilis =

Species of plant

Liatris gracilis, the slender blazing-star or slender gayfeather, is a species of flowering plant in the family Asteraceae. A perennial reaching 40 in (1 m) but often considerably shorter, it is native to the southeastern US states of Alabama, Florida, Georgia, Mississippi, and South Carolina. It has been observed in habitats such as longleaf pine-wiregrass communities, oak scrub, grasslands, and sandhills.

== Ecology ==
Liatris gracilis is insect pollinated and is recorded to have been visited in northern Florida by Bombus impatiens.

== Subtaxa ==
The following varieties are accepted:

- Liatris gracilis var. gholsonii (L.C.Anderson) D.B.Ward – Florida
- Liatris gracilis var. gracilis – entire range
