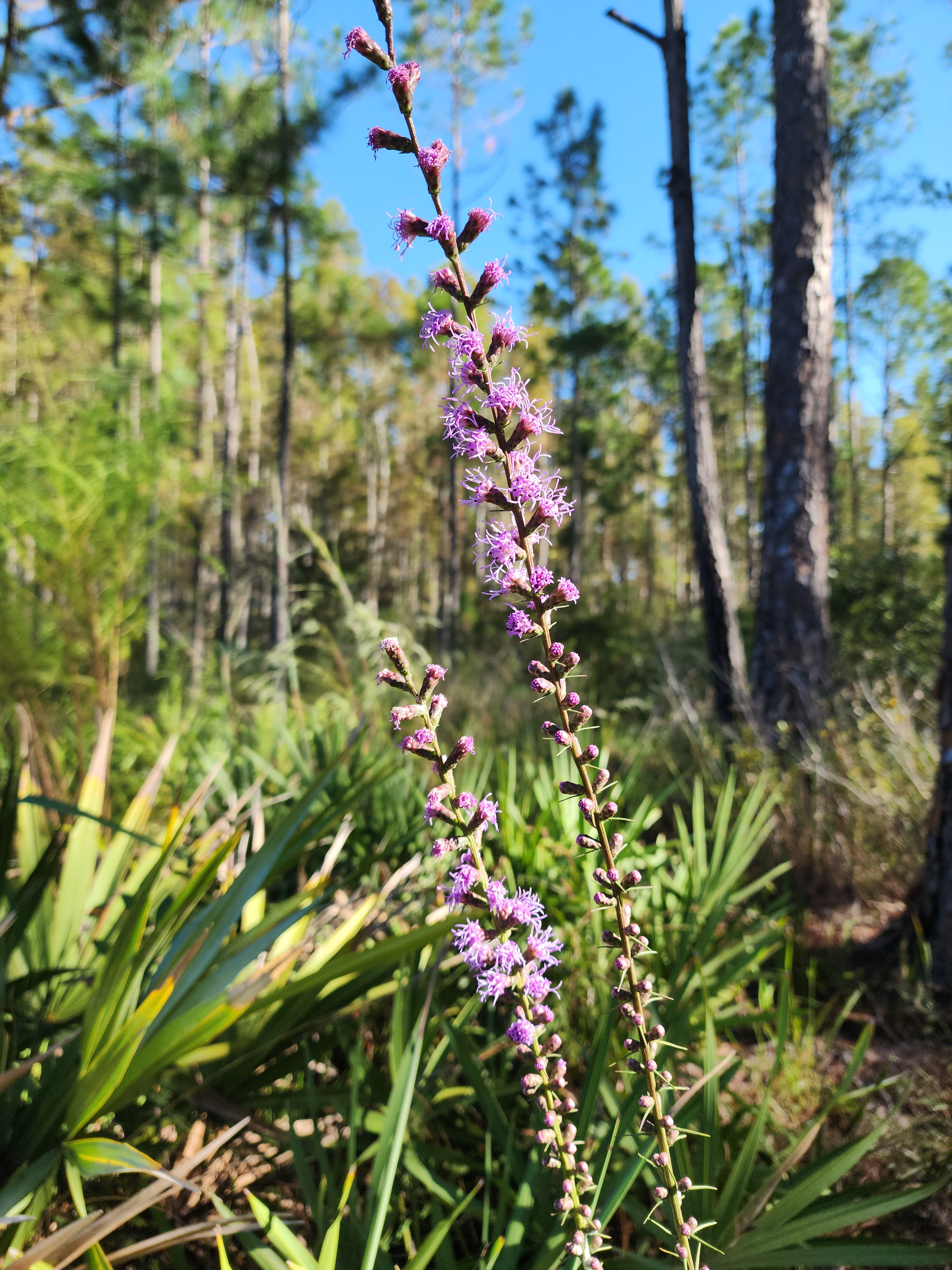
- Blooming in pine flatwoods

Conservation status
- Vulnerable (NatureServe)

Scientific classification
- Kingdom: Plantae
- Clade: Tracheophytes
- Clade: Angiosperms
- Clade: Eudicots
- Clade: Asterids
- Order: Asterales
- Family: Asteraceae
- Genus: Liatris
- Species: L. savannensis

Binomial name
- Liatris savannensis Kral & G.L.Nesom

= Liatris savannensis =

Species of flowering plant

Liatris savannensis, commonly referred to as savanna gayfeather, is a species of flowering plant endemic to a few counties in southwest peninsular Florida, United States.

== Habitat ==
It only occurs in mesic pine flatwoods of Florida's southwest gulf coast. It is known historically from the counties, from north to south, of Pinellas, Hillsborough, Manatee, Sarasota, Charlotte, and Lee.
