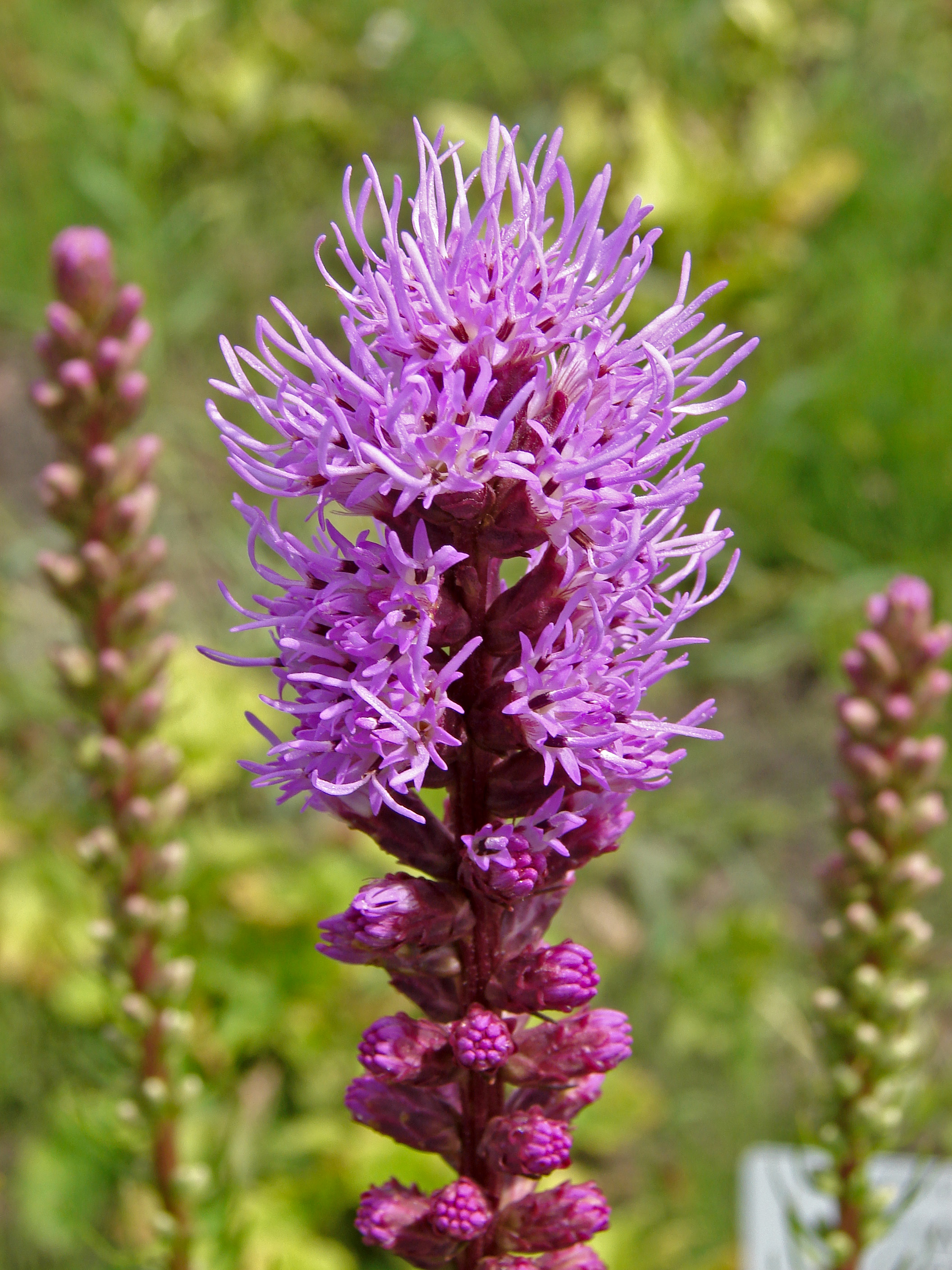
- Liatris spicata

Scientific classification
- Kingdom: Plantae
- Clade: Tracheophytes
- Clade: Angiosperms
- Clade: Eudicots
- Clade: Asterids
- Order: Asterales
- Family: Asteraceae
- Subfamily: Asteroideae
- Tribe: Eupatorieae
- Genus: Liatris; Gaertn. ex Schreb.

Synonyms
- Lacinaria Hill; Calostelma D.Don; Suprago Gaertn.; Ammopursus Small

= Liatris =

Genus of flowering plants

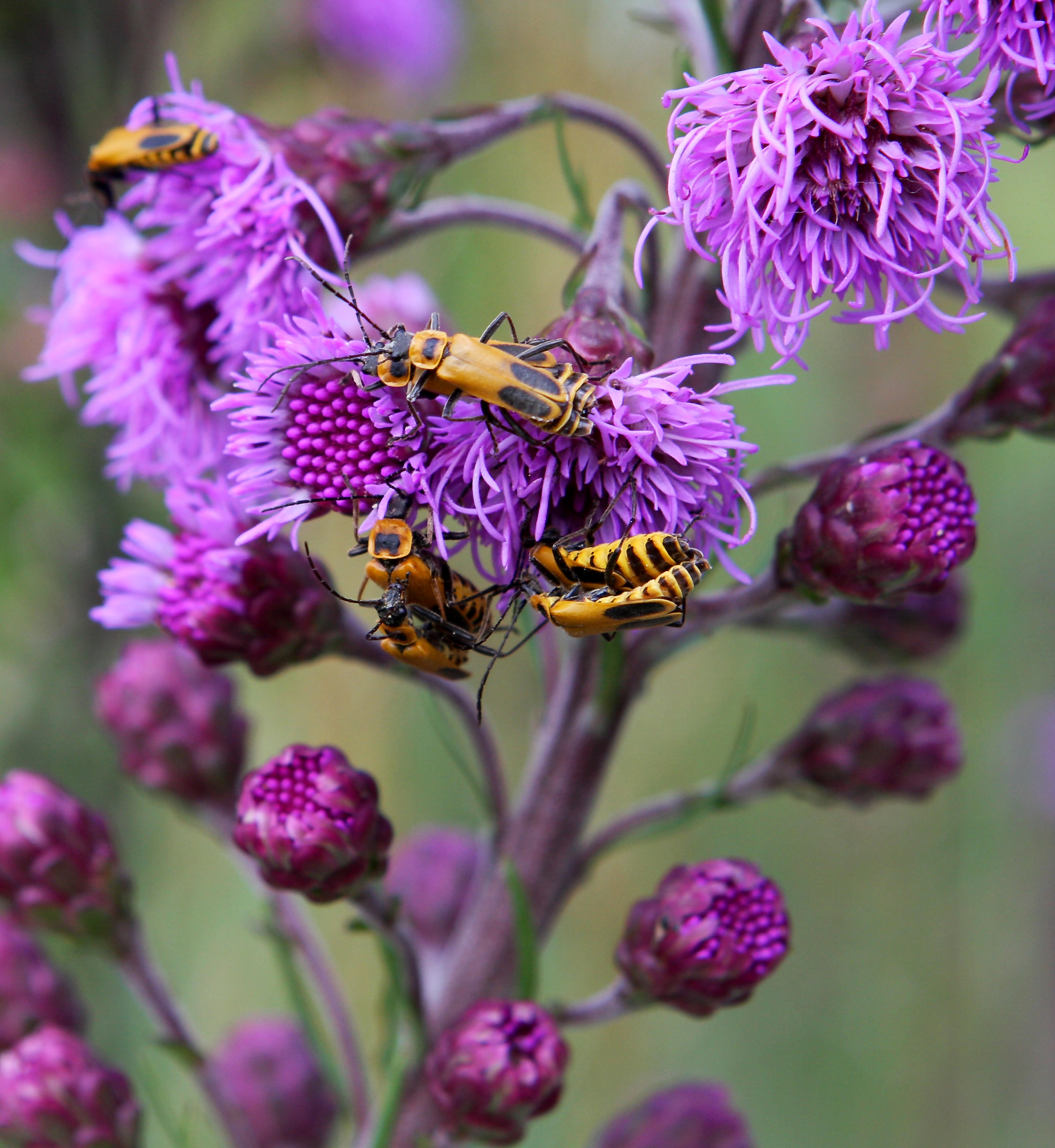
Liatris ligulistylis with goldenrod soldier beetles (Chauliognathus pennsylvanicus) on it

Liatris (/laɪˈætrɪs/), commonly known as gayfeather and blazing star is a genus of flowering plants in the tribe Eupatorieae within the family Asteraceae native to North America (Canada, United States, Mexico and the Bahamas). Some species are used as ornamental plants, sometimes in flower bouquets. They are perennials, surviving the winter and resprouting from underground corms.

Liatris species are used as food plants by the larvae of some Lepidoptera species such as moths of the genus Schinia.

== Classification ==
Liatris is in the tribe Eupatorieae of the aster family. Like other members of this tribe, the flower heads have disc florets and no ray florets. Liatris is in the subtribe Liatrinae along with Trilisa, Carphephorus, and other genera. Liatris is closely related to Garberia, a genus with only one species endemic to Florida. The two genera can be distinguished by the shrub form of the latter and by karyotype.

== Species ==
Species in the genus include:

- Liatris acidota – sharp blazing star, Gulf Coast blazing star - TX LA
- Liatris aestivalis – summer blazing star - TX OK
- Liatris aspera – tall blazing star - ONT, United States (Mississippi Valley, Great Lakes, scattered locales in East)
- Liatris borealis - Allegheny Mountains of PA
- Liatris × boykinii - GA AL
- Liatris bracteata – bracted blazing star - TX
- Liatris chapmanii – Chapman's blazing star - FL GA AL
- Liatris cokeri – Coker's blazing star - NC SC
- Liatris compacta – scaly blazing star - AR OK
- Liatris creditonensis - ONT
- Liatris cylindracea – Ontario blazing star, fewhead blazing star - ONT, central + southeastern United States
- Liatris cymosa – branched blazing star - TX
- Liatris × deamii
- Liatris densispicata - MN
- Liatris elegans – pinkscale blazing star, elegant blazing star - TX OK AR LA MS AL FL GA SC
- Liatris elegantula – shaggy blazing star - TN MS AL GA FL
- Liatris fallacior - ND
- Liatris × frostii - MN MO
- Liatris garberi – Garber's blazing star - FL Bahamas
- Liatris gholsonii – Gholson's blazing star - FL
- Liatris × gladewitzii - ONT, MI WI IL
- Liatris glandulosa – glandular blazing star - TX
- Liatris gracilis – slender blazing star - MS AL GA FL SC
- Liatris helleri – Heller's blazing star, turgid blazing star - MD WV VA NC
- Liatris hesperelegans – pink-scale blazing star, western elegant blazing-star - AR OK TX LA
- Liatris hirsuta – hairy blazing star - central + southeastern United States
- Liatris laevigata – shortleaf blazingstar - FL GA
- Liatris lancifolia – lanceleaf blazingstar - NM TX CO WY KS NE SD IA
- Liatris ligulistylis – Rocky Mountain blazing star, strap-style blazing star - MAN SAS ALB ND SD MN WI IL IA MO NE WY MT CO NM
- Liatris microcephala – small-head blazing star - NC SC GA AL TN KY
- Liatris novae-angliae – New England blazing-star
- Liatris ohlingerae – Florida blazing star, scrub blazing star - FL
- Liatris oligocephala – Cahaba torch - AL
- Liatris patens – spreading blazing star, Georgia blazing star - FL GA SC
- Liatris pauciflora – fewflower blazing star - AL GA FL SC NC
- Liatris pilosa – grass-leaf blazing star, shaggy blazing star - SC NC VA MD DE PA NJ
- Liatris × platylepis - LA
- Liatris provincialis – Godfrey's blazing star - FL
- Liatris punctata – dotted blazing star, plains gayfeather - MAN SAS ALB eastern + central United States Coahuila, Nuevo León, Tamaulipas, San Luis Potosí
- Liatris pycnostachya – prairie blazing star, button snakeroot, cattail gayfeather, thickspike gayfeather, Kansas gayfeather - QUE eastern United States
- Liatris × ridgwayi - IL KS
- Liatris savannensis – savanna blazing star - FL
- Liatris scariosa – northern gayfeather, devil's bite - eastern + central United States
- Liatris × serotina - LA
- Liatris × spheroidea - ONT
- Liatris spicata – dense blazing star, button snakewort, florist gayfeather, marsh blazingstar, prairie-pine - ONT QUE eastern United States
- Liatris squarrosa – loosescale gayfeather, colicroot, scaly blazing star - central + southeastern United States
- Liatris squarrulosa – southern gayfeather, Appalachian blazing star - south-central + southeastern United States
- Liatris × steelei - IL IN KY
- Liatris tenuifolia – pine-needle gayfeather, shortleaf gayfeather - AL GA SC FL
- Liatris tenuis – gulf blazing star, Shinners' gayfeather - TX LA
- Liatris virgata – wand blazing star, King's Mountain gayfeather, piedmont gayfeather - VA WV NC SC GA
- Liatris × weaveri - NE
