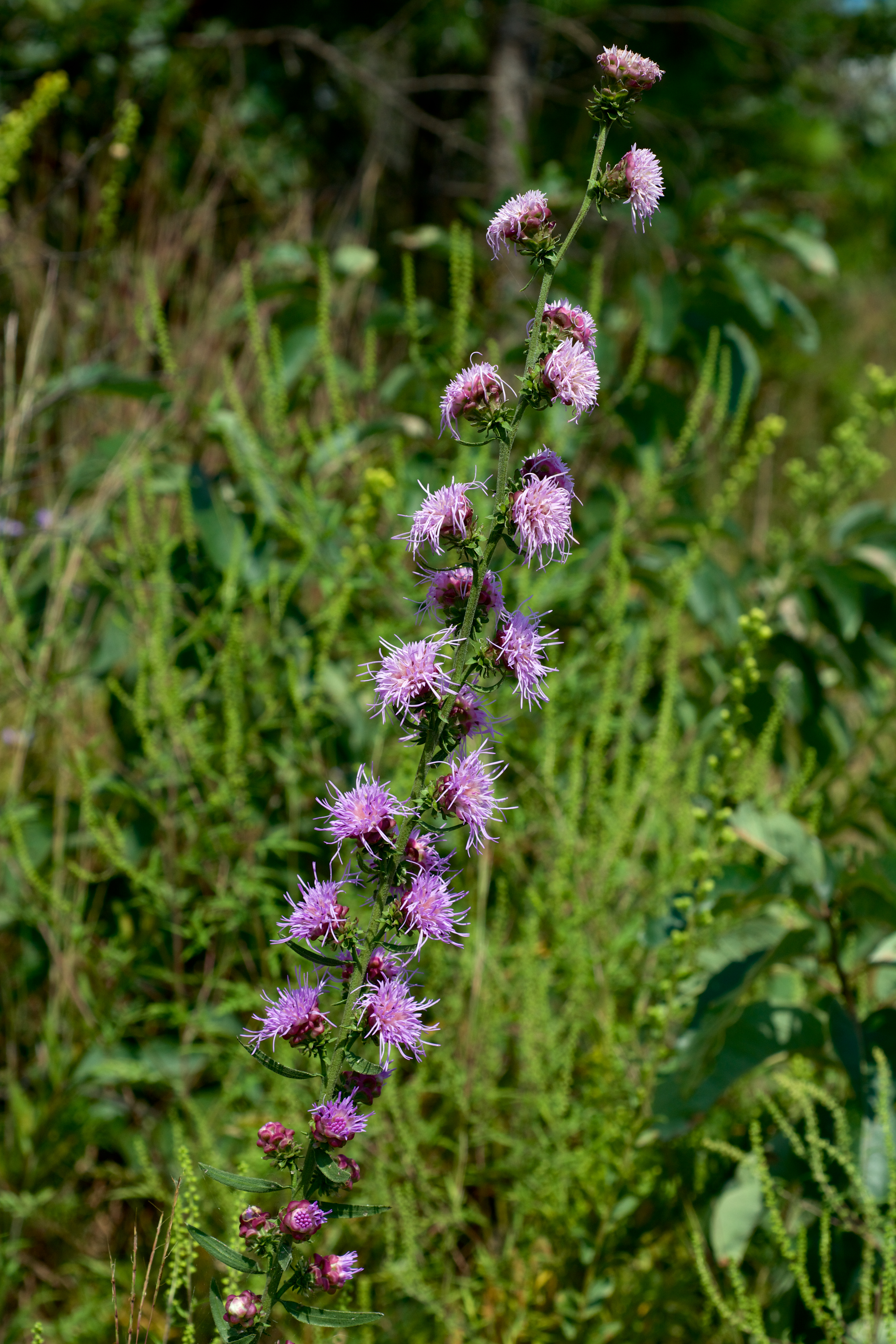

Conservation status
- Apparently Secure (NatureServe)

Scientific classification
- Kingdom: Plantae
- Clade: Tracheophytes
- Clade: Angiosperms
- Clade: Eudicots
- Clade: Asterids
- Order: Asterales
- Family: Asteraceae
- Genus: Liatris
- Species: L. aspera

Binomial name
- Liatris aspera Michx.

= Liatris aspera =

Species of flowering plant

Liatris aspera (known as rough blazing star, button blazing star, lacerate blazing star, tall prairie blazing star, or tall gayfeather) is a perennial wildflower in the Asteraceae family that is found in central to eastern North America in habitats that range from mesic to dry prairie and dry savanna.

== Description ==
Liatris aspera is a perennial herb that grows as a single, erect, unbranched stem 30 to 180 cm (1 to 6 feet) high. Leaves are numerous on the stem, alternate, and narrowly lanceolate with the lower leaves larger, up to 38 centimetres (15 in) long and 1 inch (3 cm) wide, becoming smaller and narrower higher on the plant.

The inflorescence is an erect raceme with numerous, purple, button-like flower heads, short-stalked or stalkless, blooming from the top down. It flowers from mid-August through October, with seed becoming ripe in October to November.

== Distribution and habitat ==
This plant is native to the United States from Texas to the west and New York to the east. It is also native to Ontario in Canada. It grows in prairies, glades, and savannas, and along roadsides and railroads.

== Ecology ==
It attracts birds, hummingbirds, and butterflies.

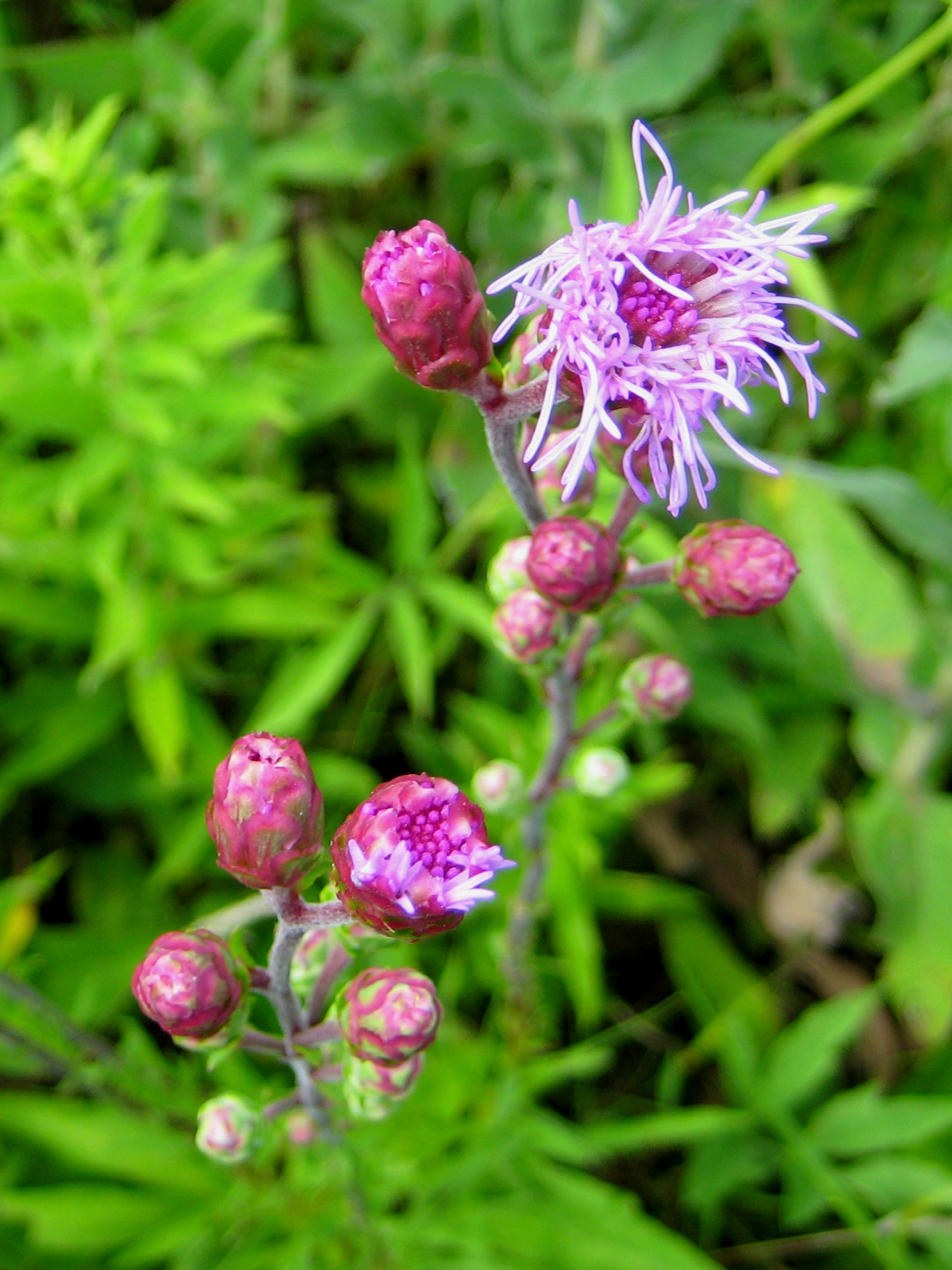
Flowers from above, some not yet blooming.

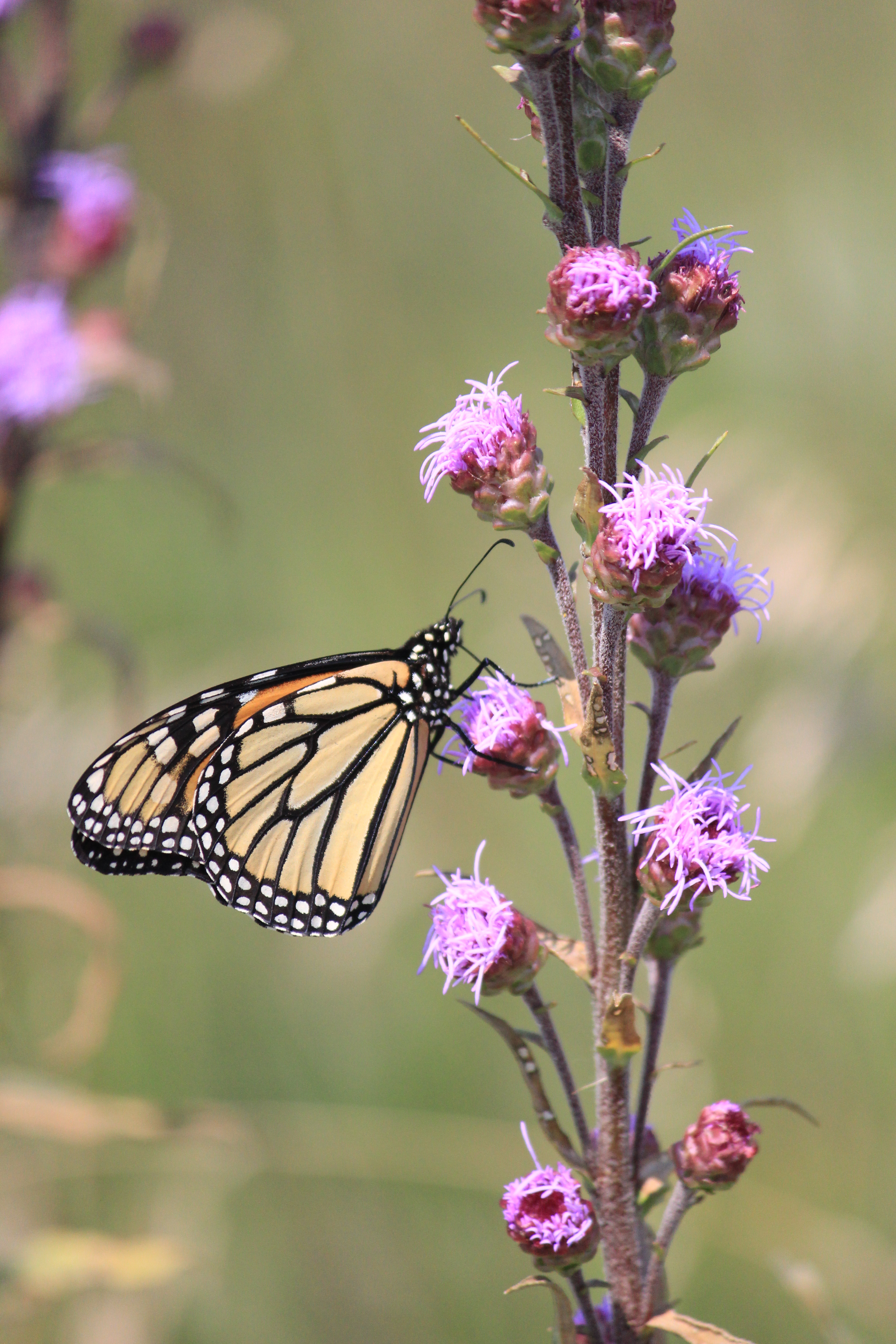
Monarch butterfly on Liatris aspera, North Dakota, USA.
