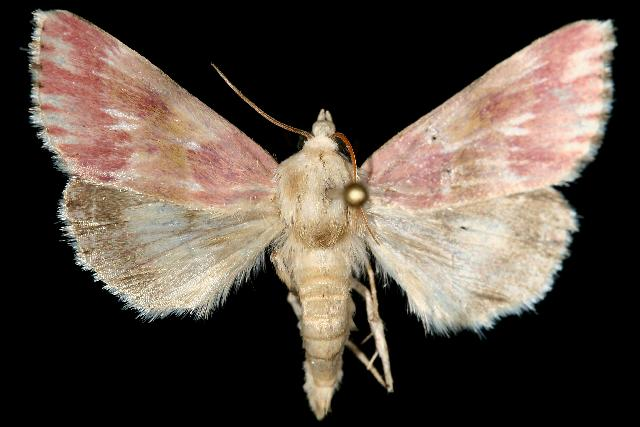

Scientific classification
- Domain: Eukaryota
- Kingdom: Animalia
- Phylum: Arthropoda
- Class: Insecta
- Order: Lepidoptera
- Superfamily: Noctuoidea
- Family: Noctuidae
- Genus: Schinia
- Species: S. sanguinea

Binomial name
- Schinia sanguinea Geyer, 1832

Synonyms
- Schinia gloriosa Strecker, 1878; Schinia terrifica Barnes & McDunnough, 1918

= Schinia sanguinea =

Species of moth

The bleeding flower moth (Schinia sanguinea) is a moth of the family Noctuidae. It is found from North Carolina to Florida, west to Texas, north to Montana. There is also a disjunct population in Ontario.

Schinia carmosina was elevated from synonymy of Schinia sanguinea and is now a separate species.

The wingspan is 24–35 mm. Adults are on wing from September to October.

The larvae feed on Liatris species.
