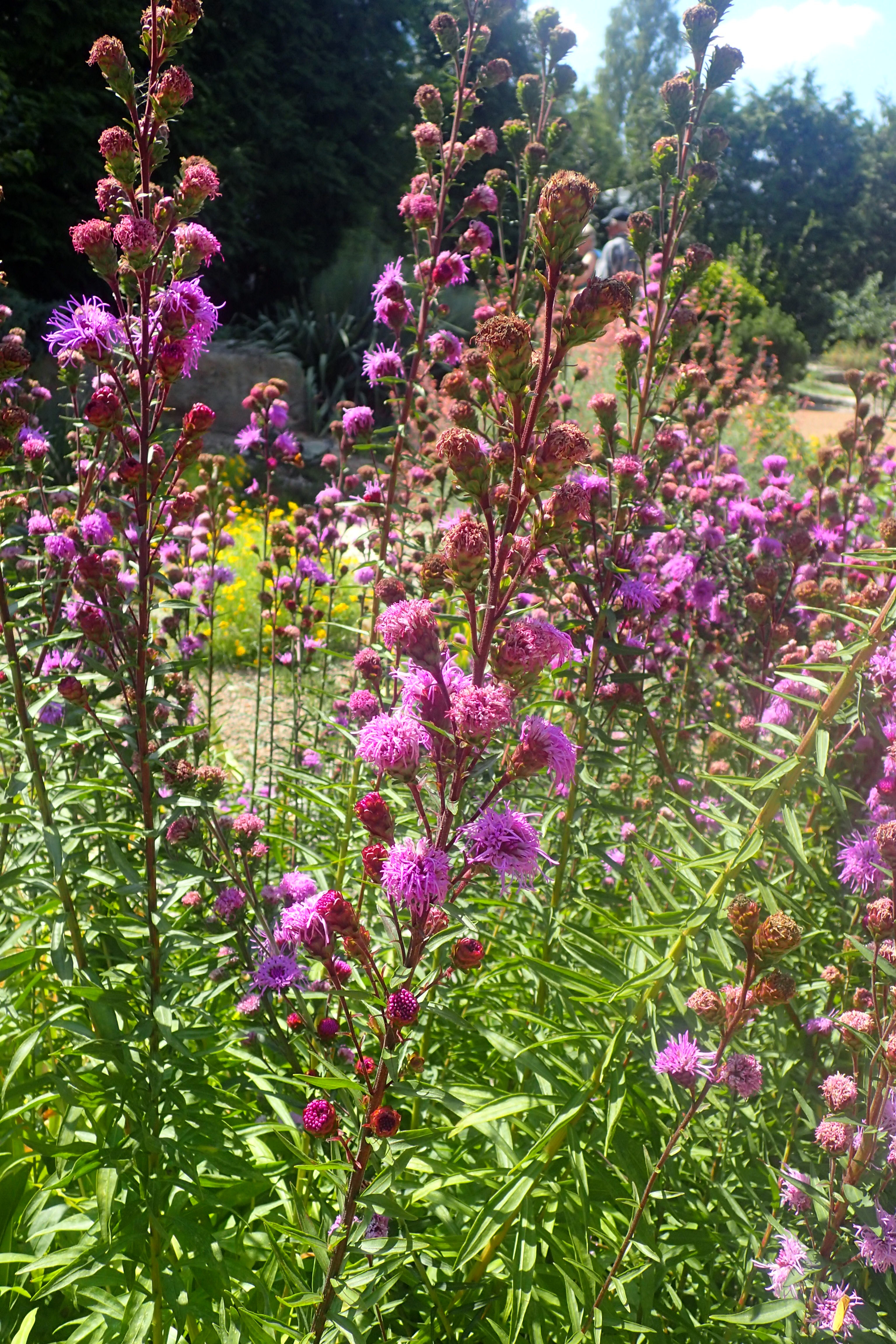

Conservation status
- Apparently Secure (NatureServe)

Scientific classification
- Kingdom: Plantae
- Clade: Embryophytes
- Clade: Tracheophytes
- Clade: Angiosperms
- Clade: Eudicots
- Clade: Asterids
- Order: Asterales
- Family: Asteraceae
- Genus: Liatris
- Species: L. scariosa

Binomial name
- Liatris scariosa (L.) Willd.

Synonyms
- List: Anonymos ramosa Walter; Lacinaria scariosa (L.) Hill; Lacinaria scariosa f. corymbulosa E.Sheld.; Lacinaria scariosa f. globosa E.Sheld.; Lacinaria scariosa f. gracillima Lunell; Lacinaria scariosa f. septentrionalis Lunell; Lacinaria scariosa f. uniflora E.Sheld.; Lacinaria scariosa f. versicolor Lunell; Lacinaria scariosa var. angustata Lunell; Lacinaria scariosa var. annuens Lunell; Lacinaria scariosa var. basilaris Lunell; Lacinaria scariosa var. brachiata Lunell; Lacinaria scariosa var. chandonnetii Lunell; Lacinaria scariosa var. composita Lunell; Lacinaria scariosa var. corymbulosa E.Sheld.; Lacinaria scariosa var. exuberans Lunell; Lacinaria scariosa var. galli Lunell; Lacinaria scariosa var. immanis Lunell; Lacinaria scariosa var. inconcinna Lunell; Lacinaria scariosa var. insolens Lunell; Lacinaria scariosa var. multiplex Lunell; Lacinaria scariosa var. nictitans Lunell; Lacinaria scariosa var. obesa Lunell; Lacinaria scariosa var. opima Lunell; Lacinaria scariosa var. perusta Lunell; Lacinaria scariosa var. petiolata Lunell; Lacinaria scariosa var. porrecta Lunell; Lacinaria scariosa var. praecellens Lunell; Lacinaria scariosa var. praeceps Lunell; Lacinaria scariosa var. praesignis Lunell; Lacinaria scariosa var. praestans Lunell; Lacinaria scariosa var. propinqua Lunell; Lacinaria scariosa var. ramea Lunell; Lacinaria scariosa var. scalaris Lunell; Lacinaria scariosa var. singularis Lunell; Lacinaria scariosa var. spheroidea Farw.; Lacinaria scariosa var. strictissima Lunell; Lacinaria scariosa var. subcorymbosa Lunell; Lacinaria scariosa var. subcymosa Lunell; Lacinaria scariosa var. superans Lunell; Lacinaria scariosa var. supereminens Lunell; Lacinaria scariosa var. superscandens Lunell; Lacinaria scariosa var. trilisioides Farw.; Lacinaria scariosa var. uniflora Lunell; Lacinaria scariosa var. virgata Lunell; Lacinaria scariosa var. virginiana Lunell; Liatris scariosa var. deamii Peattie; Liatris scariosa var. typica Gaiser; Liatris scariosa var. virginiana (Lunell) Gaiser; Liatris varia Banks ex Pursh; Serratula scariosa L.; Suprago sphaerocephala Cass.

= Liatris scariosa =

Species of flowering plant

Liatris scariosa, the savanna blazing star, is a species of flowering plant in the genus Liatris, native to the US states of Maryland, North Carolina, Pennsylvania, Tennessee, Virginia and West Virginia. It is fire-adapted, and the plant's seeds germinate only if they detect chemicals produced from burning wood. It is a perennial herb that grows in dry woods and clearings. The species epithet scariosa means shriveled in scientific Latin.
