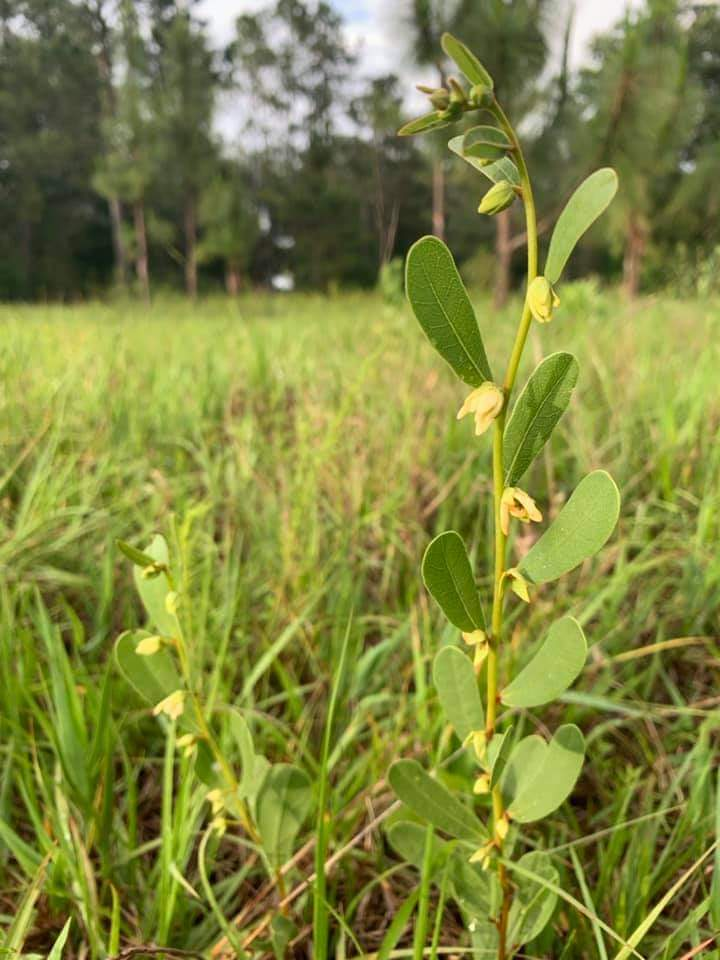

Conservation status
- Critically Imperiled (NatureServe)

- Endangered (ESA)

Scientific classification
- Kingdom: Plantae
- Clade: Tracheophytes
- Clade: Angiosperms
- Clade: Magnoliids
- Order: Magnoliales
- Family: Annonaceae
- Genus: Asimina
- Species: A. rugelii

Binomial name
- Asimina rugelii B.L.Rob.

Synonyms
- Deeringothamnus rugelii (B.L.Rob.) Small

= Asimina rugelii =

Species of plant

Asimina rugelii is a rare species of flowering plant in the custard apple family known by the common names Rugel's pawpaw, Rugel's false pawpaw, and yellow squirrel banana. It is endemic to Volusia County, Florida, in the United States, where there are fewer than 5000 plants remaining in severely fragmented habitat. The main threat to this species is habitat destruction and degradation. It was federally listed as an endangered species in 1986.

Formerly in the genus Deeringothamnus, the species has been moved back into Asimina after phylogenetic research. It can be differentiated from Asimina pulchella by the width, shape, and color of its petals. This species is a small shrub growing not more than half a meter tall from a taproot. The leathery leaf blades are somewhat oblong or lance-shaped and measure up to 7 centimeters in length. The inflorescence is a solitary flower nodding or held upright on a short peduncle. The lightly scented flowers have usually six fleshy yellow, cream, or purple petals that measure 2 or 3 centimeters long. The fragrance of the flowers has been described as "rubbery", and is caused by several compounds, including ethyl benzoate, trans-β-ocimene, limonene, and germacrene. Its pollen is shed as permanent tetrads. The fruit is a large yellow-green berry that may be up to 6 centimeters long. One flower may yield several fruits. The berry contains a few seeds each about a centimeter long or slightly larger. This plant sometimes hybridizes with its relative, Asimina pygmaea.

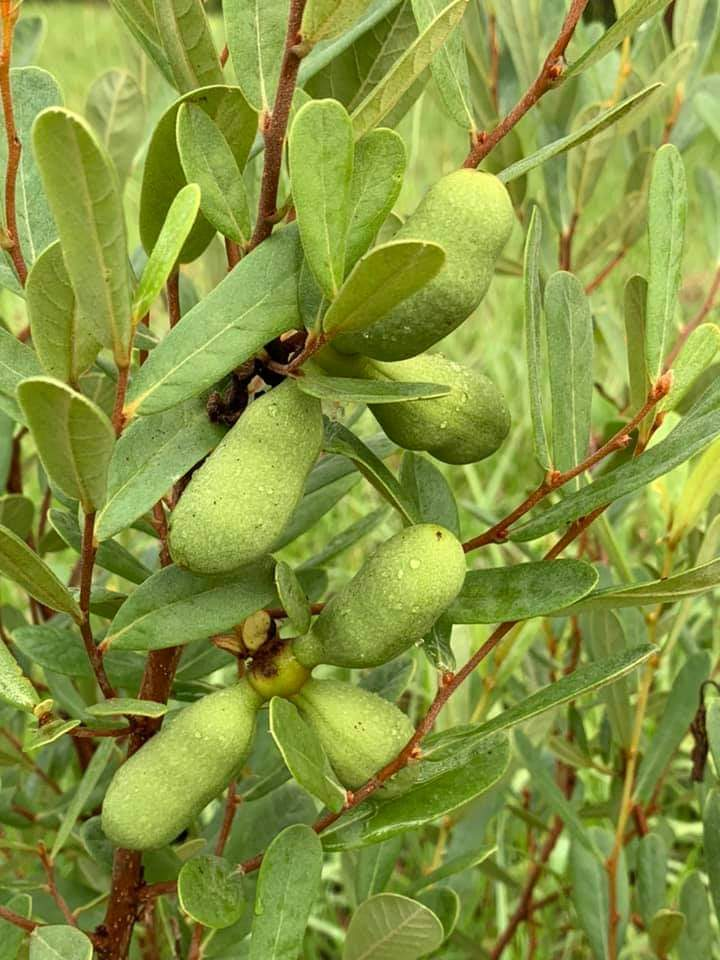
Asimina rugelii fruiting in Volusia county FL

This plant occurs in slash pine woods on wet, sandy substrates among other plant species, including saw palmetto, fetterbush (Lyonia lucida), shiny blueberry (Vaccinium myrsinites), dwarf live oak (Quercus minima), and wiregrass (Aristida stricta). It is limited to Volusia County, where there are perhaps 23 occurrences remaining. Some of them are within the bounds of Tiger Bay State Forest The region becoming ever more urbanized and developed, with wild habitat claimed for residential, commercial, and agricultural purposes, including pine plantations and turfgrass farms. Remaining fragments of land in Volusia County are degraded by a number of processes, especially fire suppression. The habitat is naturally maintained by periodic wildfire, and this plant is fire-dependent. It requires fire to clear larger vegetation and brush away so it can receive adequate sunlight. It has also been demonstrated that fire increases the plant's flower production. Other threats to the habitat and its plants include exotic plant species such as Bahia grass (Paspalum notatum).
