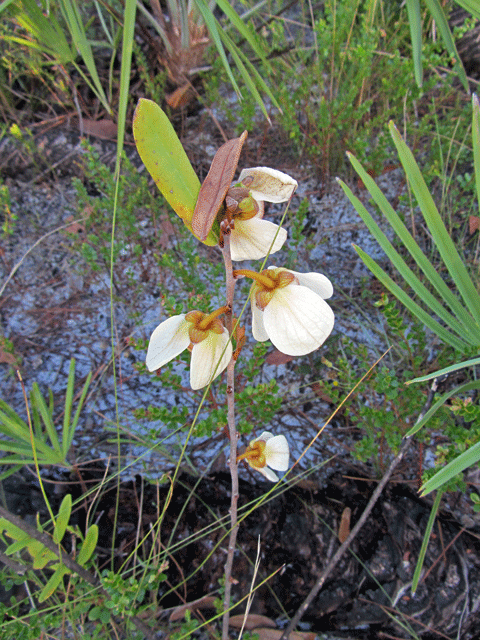

Conservation status
- Least Concern (IUCN 3.1)

- Vulnerable (NatureServe)

Scientific classification
- Kingdom: Plantae
- Clade: Tracheophytes
- Clade: Angiosperms
- Clade: Magnoliids
- Order: Magnoliales
- Family: Annonaceae
- Genus: Asimina
- Species: A. obovata

Binomial name
- Asimina obovata (Willd.) Nash

Synonyms
- Annona obovata Willd.; Pityothamnus obovatus (Willd.) Small; Uvaria obovata (Willd.) Torr. & A.Gray

= Asimina obovata =

Species of flowering plant

Asimina obovata, the bigflower pawpaw, is a shrub or small tree in the custard apple family. It is an endemic native to Florida, where it is found on open sandy hammocks and in dry woods. Showy white flowers in late winter to early summer are followed by large green edible fruit. Its pollen is shed as permanent tetrads. Along with the other members of the genus, it serves as a host plant for the zebra swallowtail butterfly and pawpaw sphinx moth.

== Description ==
The leaves of A. obovata are alternately arranged and have pinnate venation. It may occur as a shrub or tree, with the potential to grow up to 3.5 meters (11 ft) in height. The flowers it produces may get up to 10 centimeters (4 in) across, and fruit may reach a length of over 7 centimeters (3 in).

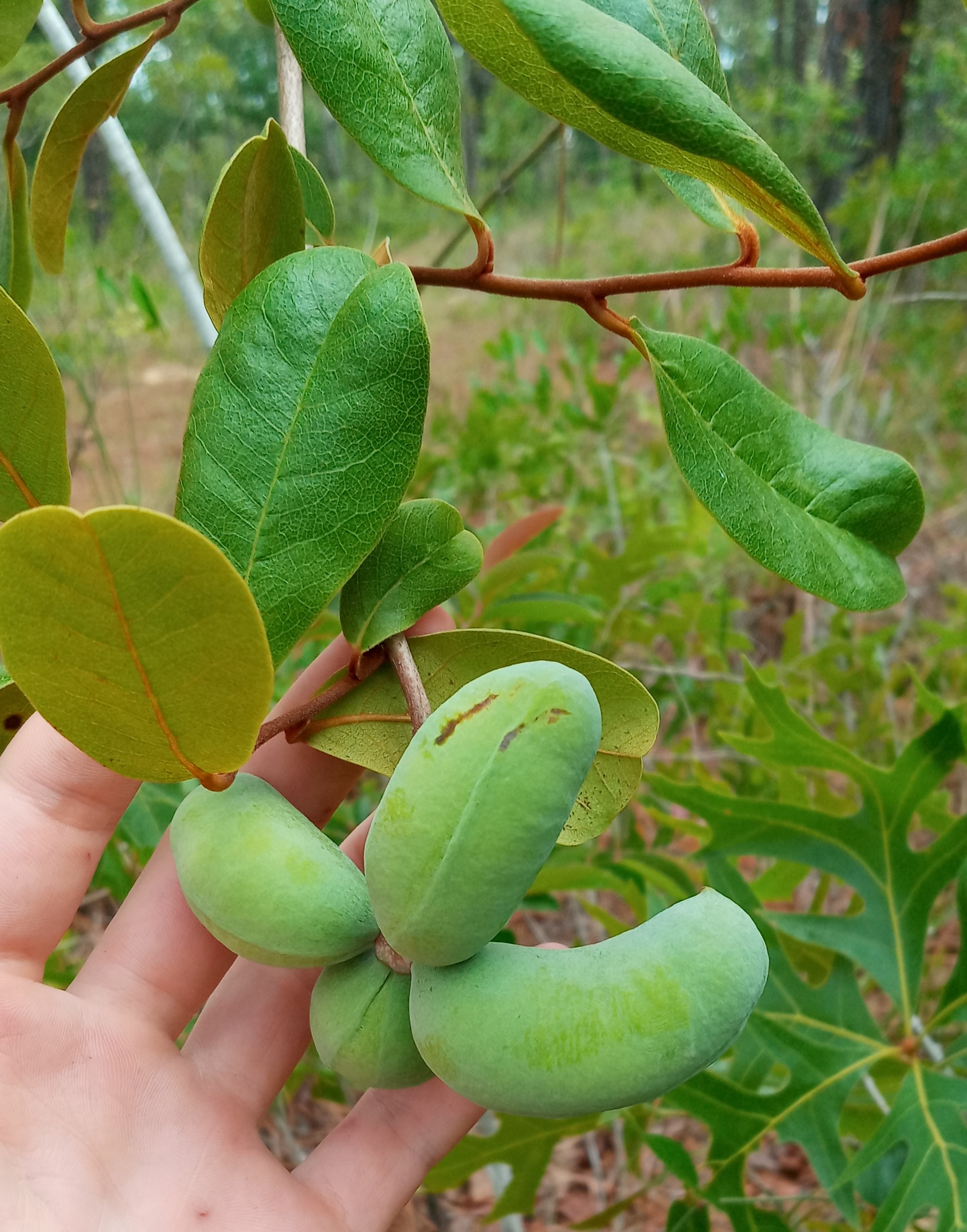
Asimina obovata in fruit
