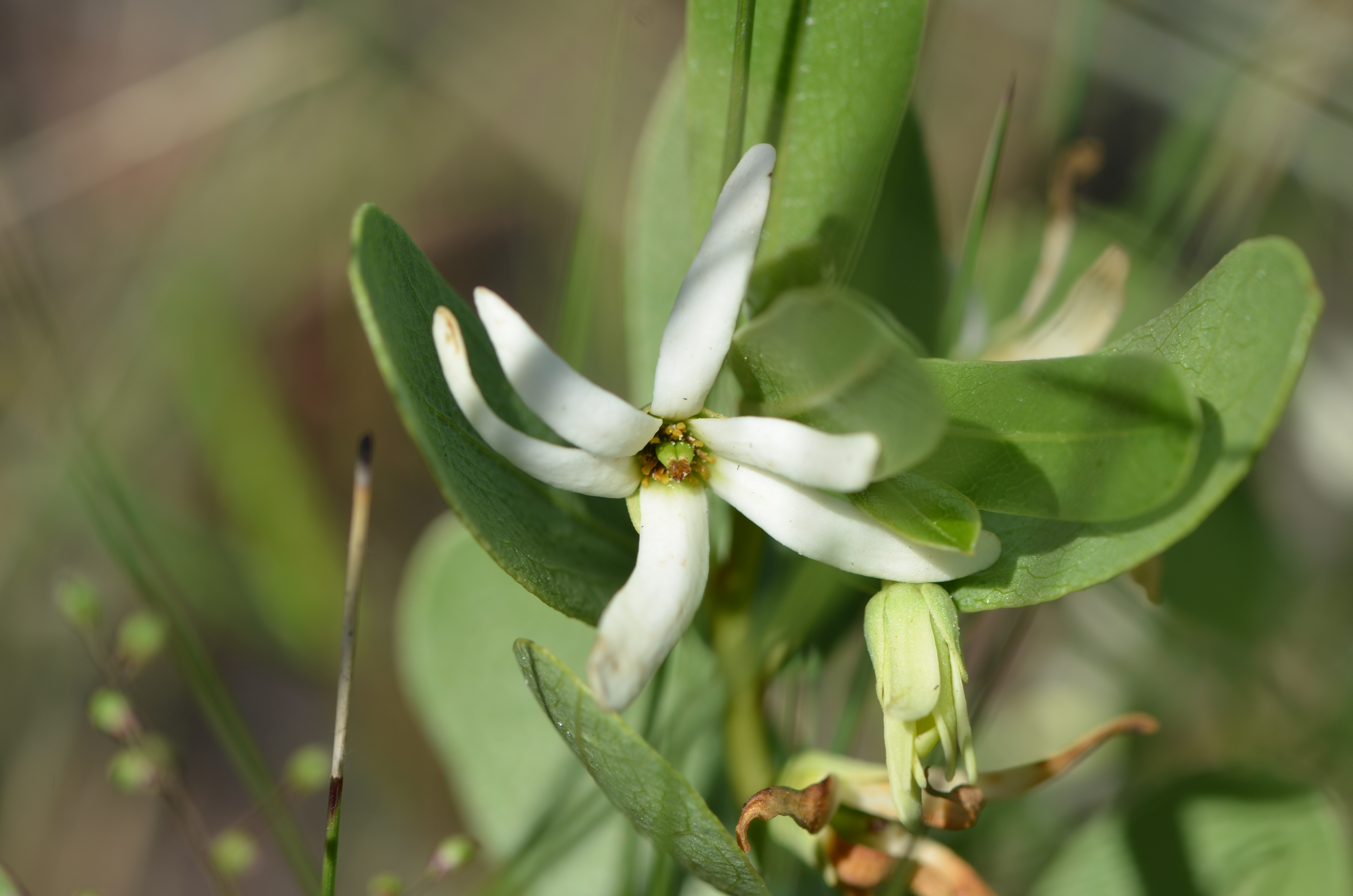

Conservation status
- Imperiled (NatureServe)

- Endangered (ESA)

Scientific classification
- Kingdom: Plantae
- Clade: Tracheophytes
- Clade: Angiosperms
- Clade: Magnoliids
- Order: Magnoliales
- Family: Annonaceae
- Genus: Asimina
- Species: A. pulchella

Binomial name
- Asimina pulchella (Small) Rehder & Dayton

Synonyms
- Deeringothamnus pulchellus Small; Deeringothamnus rugelli var. pulchellus (Small) D.B. Ward

= Asimina pulchella =

Species of flowering plant

Asimina pulchella is a rare species of flowering plant in the custard apple family known by the common names beautiful pawpaw, royal false pawpaw, and white squirrel banana. It is a federally listed endangered species.

== Distribution ==
It is endemic to Florida in the United States, where there are perhaps 5000 plants remaining in severely fragmented habitat spread across three counties: Charlotte, Lee, and Orange County.

This plant occurs in slash pine woods on sandy substrates among other plant species, including saw palmetto, fetterbush (Lyonia lucida), shiny blueberry (Vaccinium myrsinites), dwarf live oak (Quercus minima), and tarflower (Bejaria racemosa). The Orange County occurrences are about 100 miles disjunct from the Charlotte and Lee populations.

== Description ==
This species is a small shrub growing not more than half a meter tall from a taproot. The leathery leaf blades are somewhat oval, oblong, or spatula-shaped, measuring 4 to 7 centimeters in length. The inflorescence is a solitary flower nodding or held upright on a short peduncle. The sweet-scented flowers have varying numbers of fleshy white or pink-tinged petals that measure 2 or 3 centimeters long. The sweet fragrance of the flowers in this species is caused by benzenoid compounds including veratrole, and the alcohol linalool. Its pollen is shed as permanent tetrads. The flowers are pollinated by a number of insects, including the beetle Mordella atrata and the thrips species Frankliniella bispinosa and Thrips hawaiiensis. The fruit is a large yellow-green berry that may be up to 7 centimeters long. One flower may yield several fruits. The berry contains a few seeds each about a centimeter long or slightly larger. This plant sometimes hybridizes with its relative, Asimina reticulata.

== Threats ==
The main threats to this species are habitat destruction and degradation. It was federally listed as an endangered species in 1986.

Both distribution regions are becoming ever more urbanized, with wild habitat claimed for residential, commercial, and agricultural purposes. Many populations of this plant have been destroyed as the land was cleared. The remaining wild tracts are highly fragmented and isolated between stretches of developed land. These fragments are degraded by a number of processes, especially fire suppression. The habitat is naturally maintained by periodic wildfire, and this plant is fire-dependent. It requires fire to clear larger vegetation and brush away so it can receive adequate sunlight. It has also been demonstrated that fire increases the plant's flower production.

Other threats to the habitat and its plants include exotic plant species such as Brazilian pepper (Schinus terebinthifolius). Other possible threats include all-terrain vehicle use, feral pigs, improper use of herbicides, and damage to plants by the leafroller caterpillar Choristoneura parallela.

Land management continues to be the main issue for this plant. Many of the remaining 39 occurrences are on protected public land, but even these are vulnerable to degradation and destruction because they are not maintained adequately. For the health of the plants, the habitat must undergo periodic burns and it should be protected from exotic plant species.
