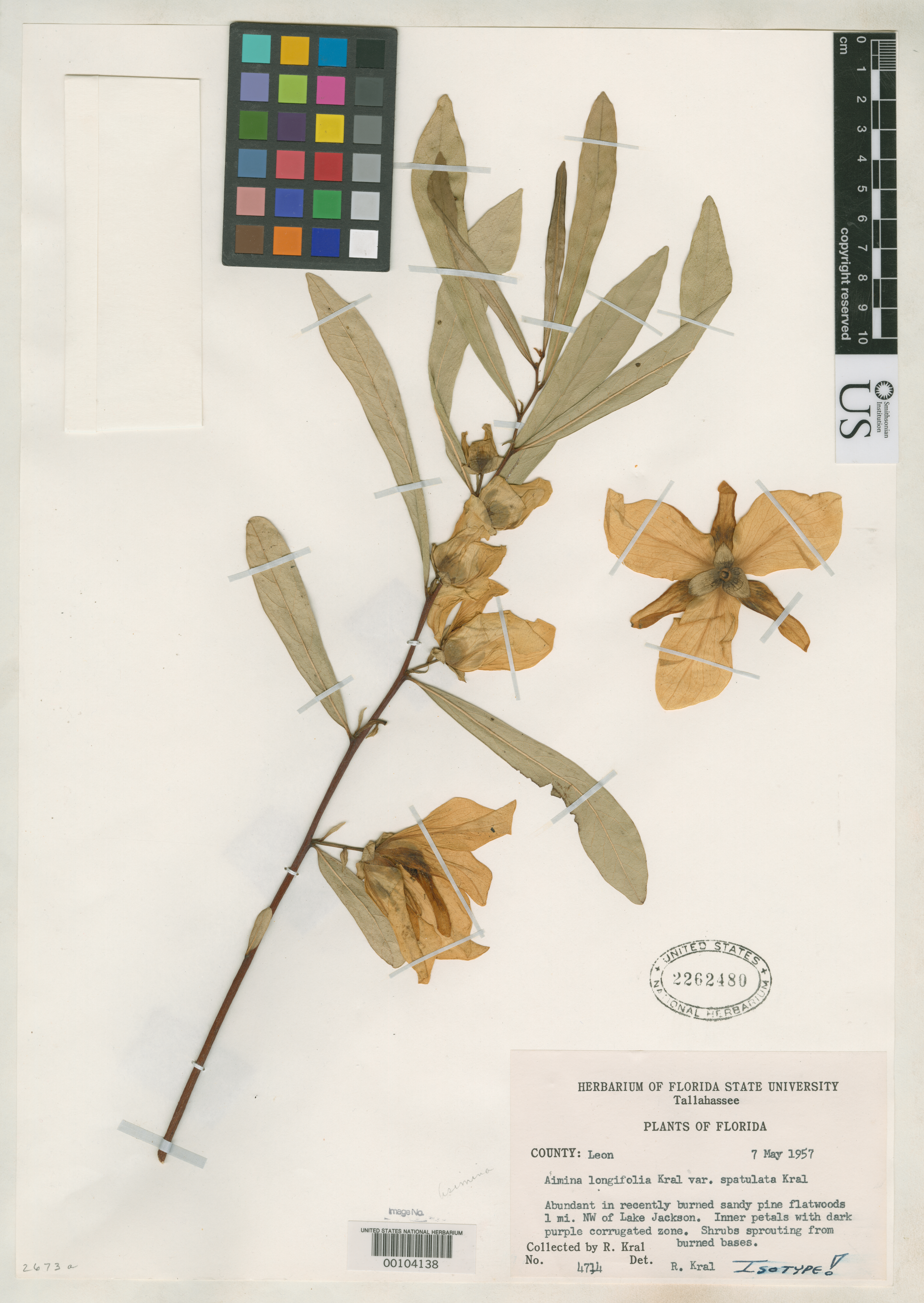

Scientific classification
- Kingdom: Plantae
- Clade: Tracheophytes
- Clade: Angiosperms
- Clade: Magnoliids
- Order: Magnoliales
- Family: Annonaceae
- Genus: Asimina
- Species: A. spatulata

Binomial name
- Asimina spatulata (Kral) D.B.Ward

= Asimina spatulata =

Species of flowering plant

Asmina spatulata is a flowering plant in the pawpaw (Asimina) genus. It is in the Annonaceae family. It grows in northern Florida southern Alabama, and eastern Georgia. A dicot shrub, it has white solitary flowers and alternate leaves.

It has been photographed in Florida.

It has also been described as a subspecies or variant of Asimina longifolia.
