= Papilio ajax =

Historic name for several butterfly species

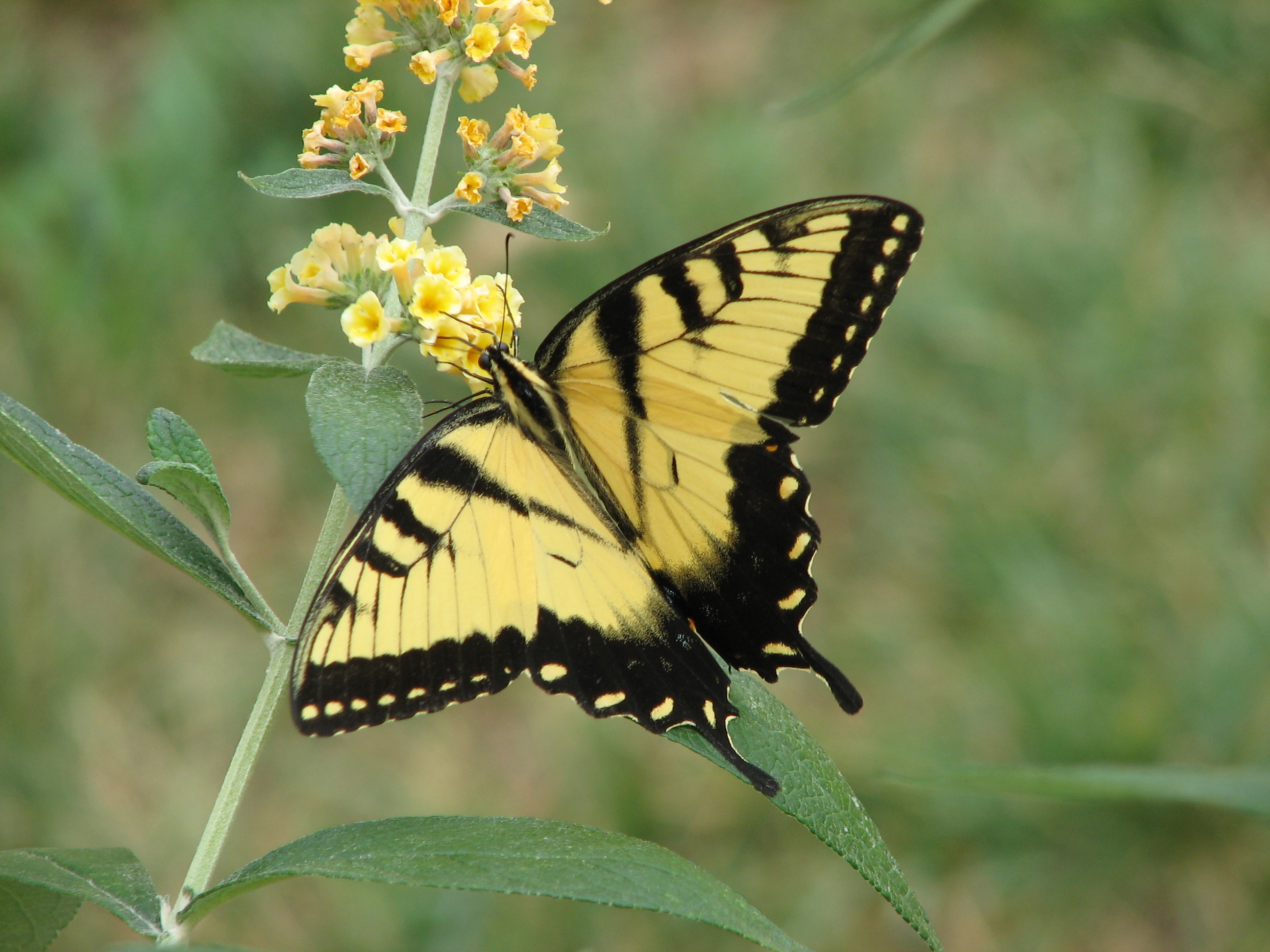
Papilio glaucus, of which Rothschild and Jordan thought Papilio ajax to be a synonym.

Papilio ajax Linnaeus, 1758 is a scientific name given in 1758 by Linnaeus to what later appeared to be a combination of three species of butterflies. The name was placed on the Official Index of Rejected and Invalid Specific Names in Zoology in 1954 after an application to that matter was submitted by Steven Corbet in 1945. The name no longer has a status as a scientific name, except in cases of homonymy; according to the rules of the International Code of Zoological Nomenclature the name Papilio ajax can no longer be given to any species.

== The name as given by Linnaeus ==
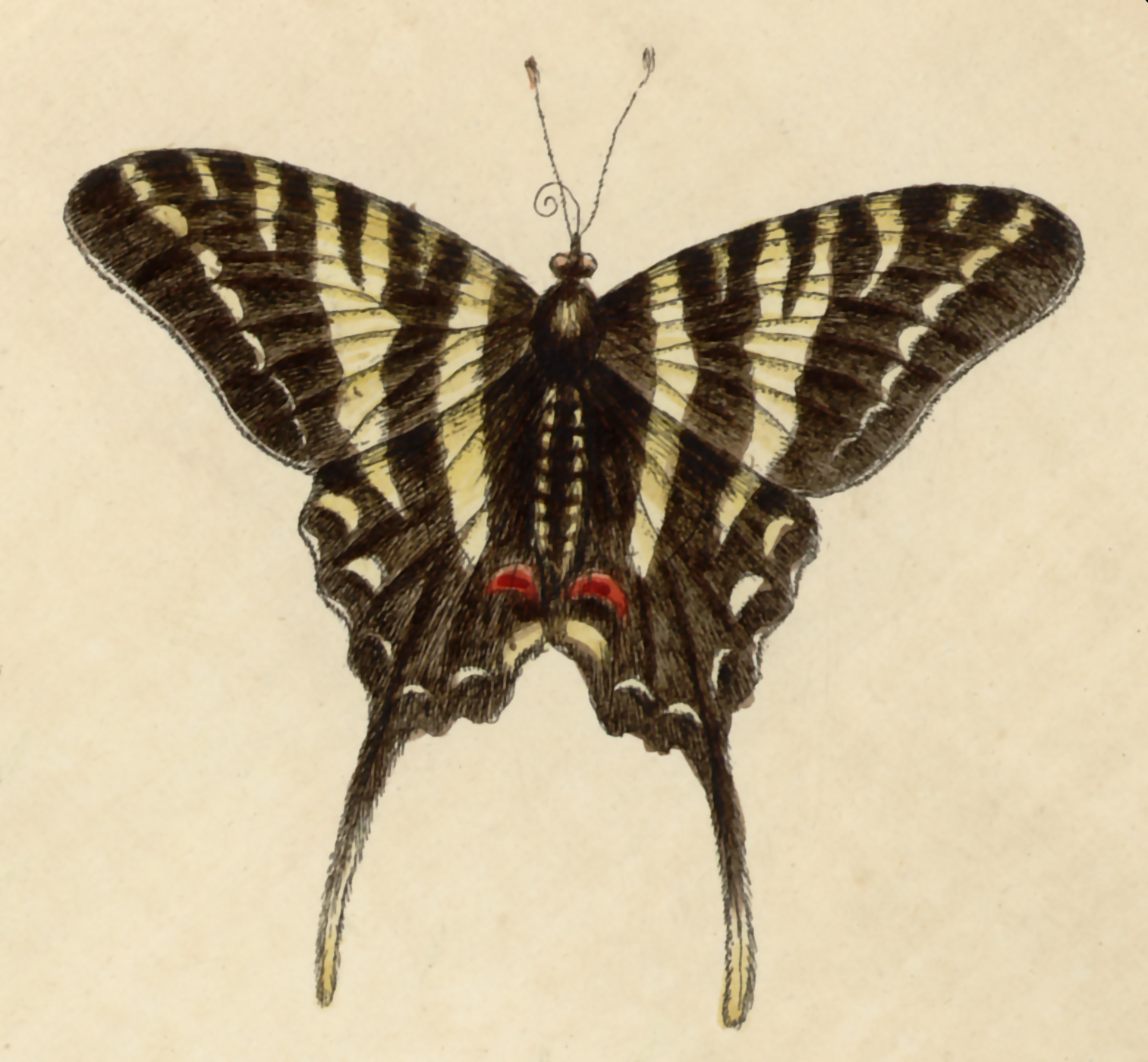
Edwards' drawing, cited by Linnaeus as a reference for Papilio ajax

Linnaeus gave the name Papilio ajax in 1758 in the tenth edition of Systema Naturae to what he believed to be a single species, which he placed in his large genus Papilio. Apart from a short description, (Note: "P[apilio] E[ques] alis obtuse caudatis concoloribus fuscis: fasciis flavescentibus, angulo ani fulvo": a Papilio of the Eques-group, wings with blunt tails, both sides dark brown with bands of yellow, the anal angle golden yellow.) he mentioned its habitat as "in America boreali" (in North-America), and provided references to "Raj. Ins. III. n. 2" (John Ray, 1710; Historia insectorum: 111, n° 2) and "Edw. av. 34" (George Edwards, 1743; A natural history of birds volume 1: 34). In Edwards a description and a picture can be found, in Ray a description and a reference to "Mouffet. Theat. Insect. p.98" (Thomas Muffet, 1634. Insectorum sive minimorum animalium theatrum; opus posthumus). Finally Linnaeus had a specimen in his collection.

== Confusion on the identity ==
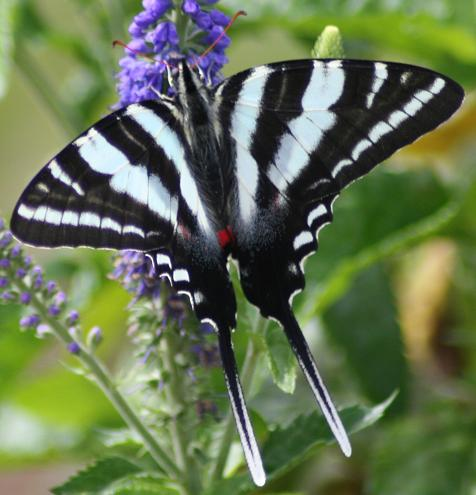
The - dark - summer form of Eurytides marcellus

In the course of time, confusion arose on the identity of Papilio ajax. The short description was applicable to several species, and the figures of Muffet and of Edwards decidedly represented different species and were moreover in conflict with Linnaeus's description. Apart from that, Linnaeus had cited Edwards's figure in 1764 in his Museum Ludovicae Ulricae as an illustration of the name Papilio protesilaus Linnaeus, 1758, a different species altogether. The type in Linnaeus's collection, now in the possession of the Linnean Society in London, was inaccessible for most entomologists, so could not be consulted. Many of them applied the name to the species named and depicted as Papilio marcellus (now Protographium marcellus) by Pieter Cramer in 1777.

In view of the confusion, Lionel Walter Rothschild and Karl Jordan totally discarded the name ajax in their Revision of the American Papilios of 1906, and used the name given by Cramer instead. They stated that Edwards's image could not be reconciled with Linnaeus's description and unmistakably represented Papilio marcellus of Cramer. They identified Muffet's drawing as a very poor image of Papilio glaucus Linnaeus, 1758. Finally, according to Rothschild and Jordan, Linnaeus's description concerned the species named Papilio polyxenes by Johann Christian Fabricius in 1775, and depicted as Papilio asterius in 1782 by Pieter Cramer (they meant his successor Caspar Stoll). This opinion was based mainly on a picture with the name Papilio ajax, published by Carl Alexander Clerck in 1764, that, according to Rothschild and Jordan, certainly had been seen by Linnaeus before publication, and which undeniably represented the species they knew as Papilio polyxenes of Fabricius. Rothschild and Jordan thus argued that the name ajax in fact represented three different taxa:

- Eurytides marcellus (Cramer, 1777), with regard to the reference to Edwards
- Papilio glaucus Linnaeus, 1758, with regard to the indirect reference to Muffet
- Papilio polyxenes asterius Stoll, 1782 with regard to the Linnean description and the later image by Clerck

== Corbet's research ==
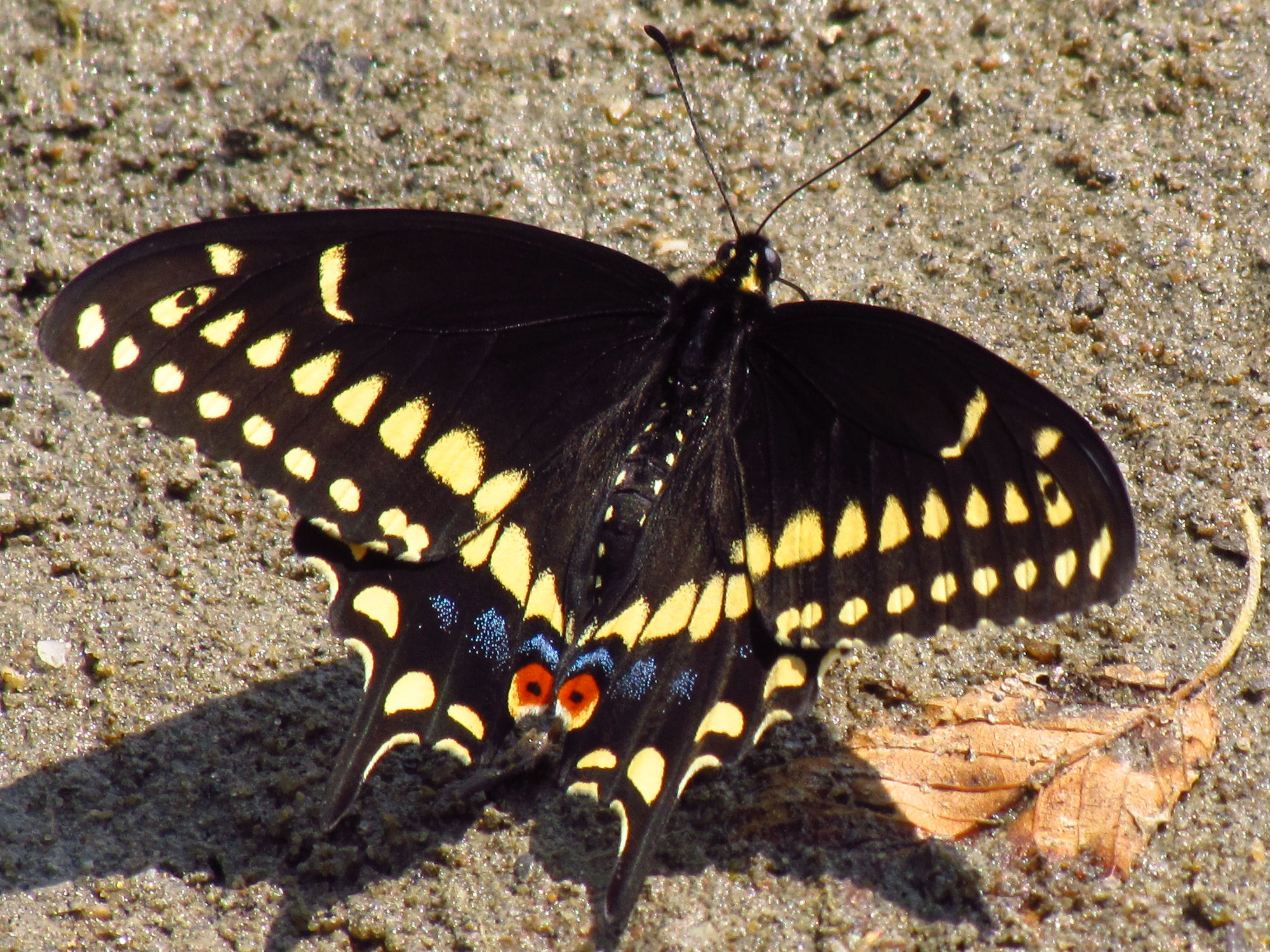
Papilio polyxenes

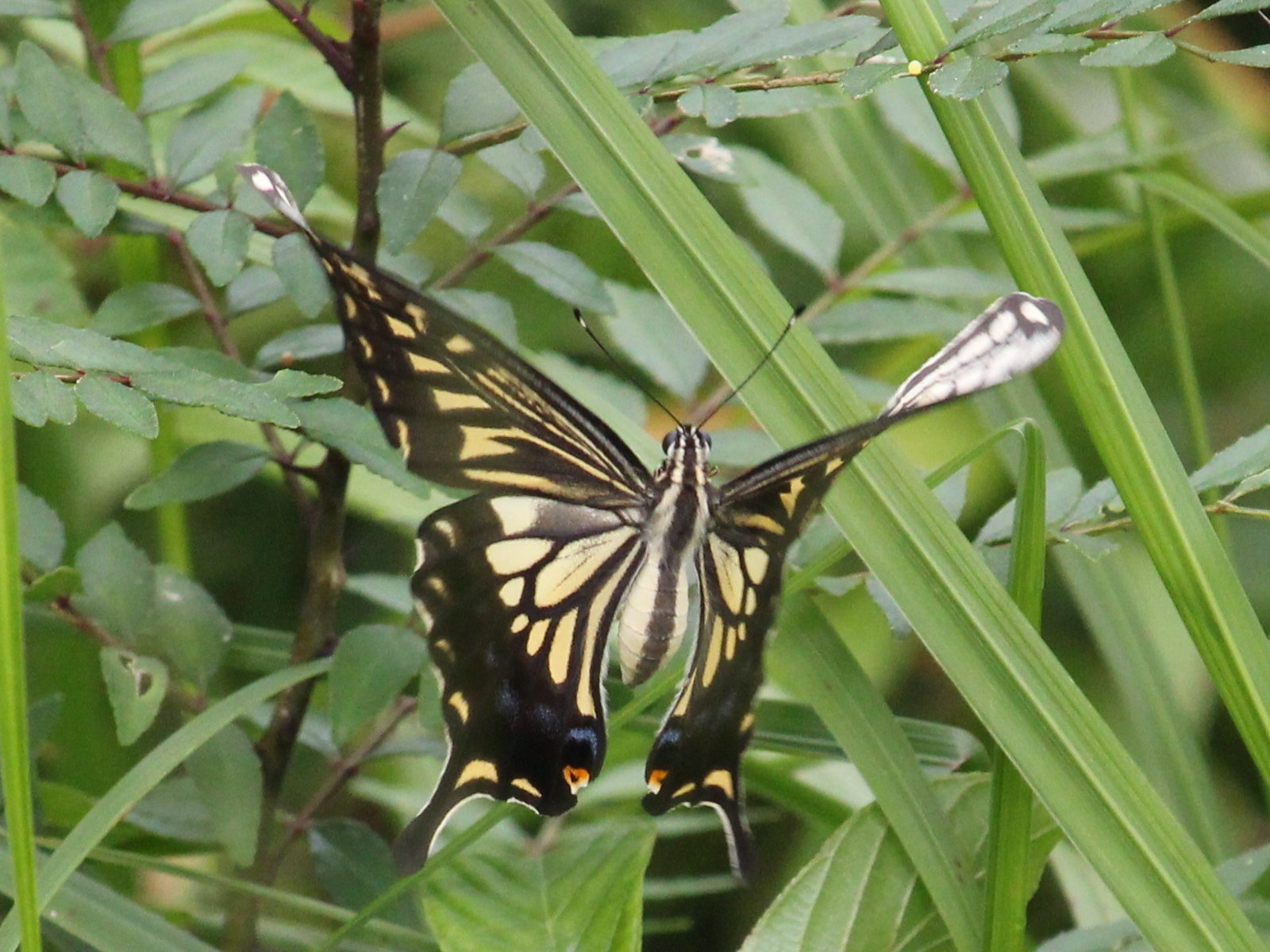
Papilio xuthus

In the 1940s, Steven Corbet was deputy-keeper of the insect collection of the Natural History Museum. He was at that time also the foremost authority on the Linnean butterflies, and had access to the collection of the Linnean Society. During research, Corbet found the specimen labelled Ajax in Linnaeus's own handwriting. (Note: A photographic image of this specimen was provided by Honey & Scoble (2001), p. 281, n° 20.) From the way it was pinned, Corbet concluded that it was almost certainly a specimen collected by Pehr Osbeck in Canton in 1751, so not of North-American origin. Corbet at once identified the type as a specimen of the Oriental species named Papilio xuthus by Linnaeus in 1767, a name by which it has ever since been known.

== Application to reject the name ==
To put an end to the confusion, Corbet submitted an application to the International Commission on Zoological Nomenclature in 1945, asking for the suppression of the name ajax as published in the combination Papilio ajax by Linnaeus. In his request, he argued that strict application of the Law of Priority would lead to an undesirable name change of the species long known as Papilio xuthus, for which the name Papilio ajax would now have to be used. As this name had been in use for one or more American species, this would only add to the confusion already existing. Upon rejection of the name ajax, the only consequence would be that the name marcellus would have to be given to the American species, a practice already initiated in 1906 by Rothschild and Jordan.

The zoological congress of 1948 in Paris entailed a lot of work for the commission, and processing of the application was delayed. Corbet died in May 1948. In 1950 Francis Hemming, secretary to the commission, issued a supplementary note on procedural problems. Its main issue was a second possible solution to the problem, seemingly overlooked by Corbet, that would secure nomenclatural stability. Other than suppressing the name ajax, it would also be possible to select a new type for the name, which would preserve the name for the Nearctic species to which it had been applied for some time. Corbet's application and Hemming's note were published at the same time in 1951 in The Bulletin of Zoological Nomenclature volume 2: 26-29 en 29-30.

In a statement of support for the proposal, Cyril Franklin dos Passos, of the American Museum of Natural History, explained that the name ajax had not been regularly used for one but for two species of Nearctic butterflies: Papilio asterius and Papilio marcellus. In his view, there was no consistent use that should be preserved by choosing a new type for the name.

== ICZN Opinion 286 ==
Voting on the proposal to reject the name ajax and to place the name xuthus on the Official List started on 7 April 1952 and closed on 7 July 1952. The outcome was 16 affirmative votes, 1 negative vote and 1 voting paper unreturned. The result was published as ICZN Opinion 286, in which the name ajax was placed on the Official Index of Rejected and Invalid Specific Names in Zoology, and the name xuthus on the Official List of Specific Names in Zoology.

In 1767, in de second volume of the twelfth edition of the Systema Naturae, the name xuthus was first given as xanthus by Linnaeus (page 751, n° 34). He had used the name a second time in the same work (page 767, n° 122). In the unpaged corrigenda, inserted at the end of the same volume, Linnaeus corrected the first name to xuthus. In a ruling, given in an Opinion, the commission has to cover al questions involved, and every name dealt with should be placed either on the Official List or on the Index. Therefore also the name xanthus, as published by Linnaeus in 1767 on page 751 of Systema Naturae (but not the one on page 767), was eventually placed on the Index.
