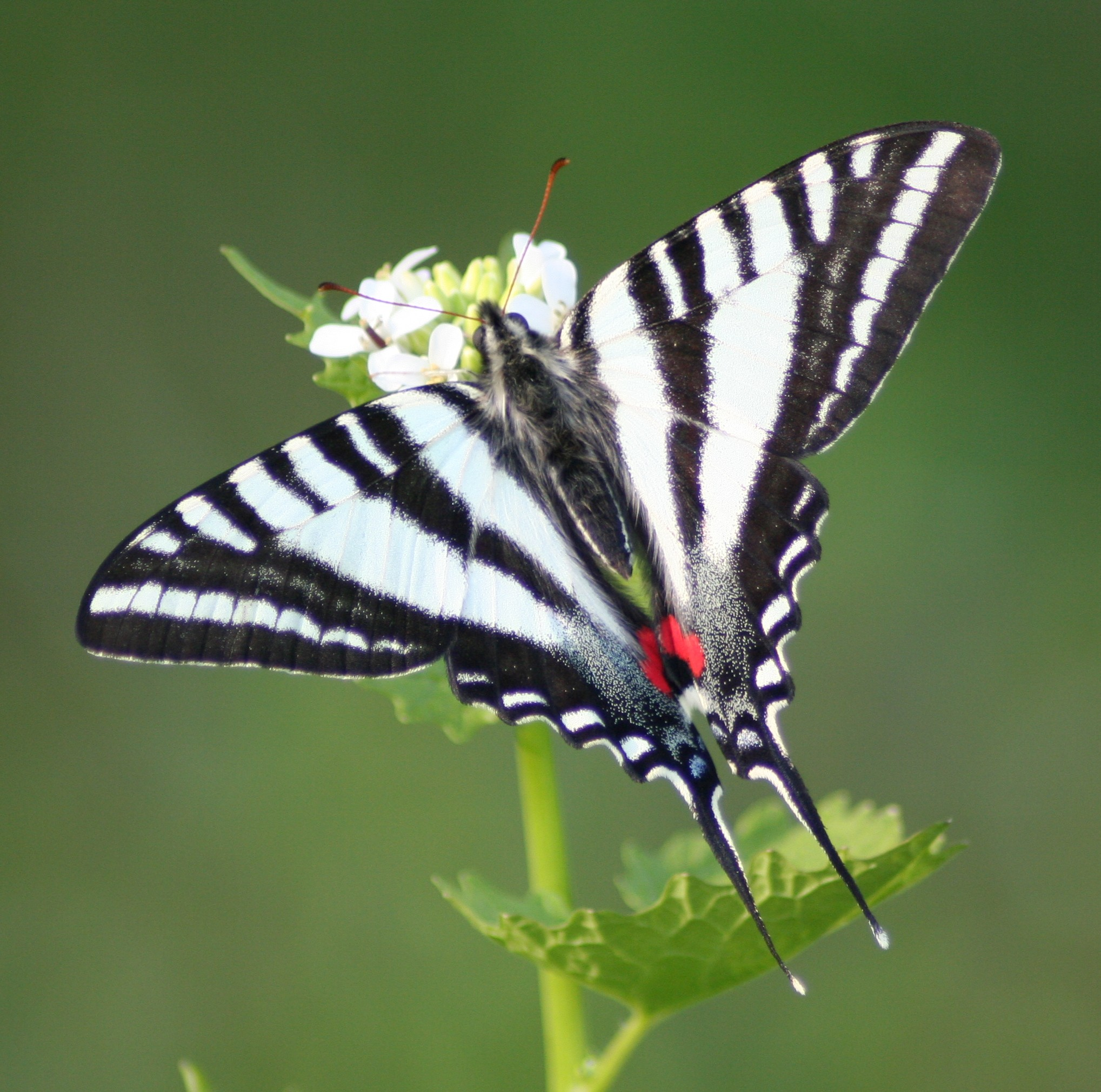
- Spring form

Conservation status
- Secure (NatureServe)

Scientific classification
- Kingdom: Animalia
- Phylum: Arthropoda
- Clade: Pancrustacea
- Class: Insecta
- Order: Lepidoptera
- Family: Papilionidae
- Genus: Eurytides
- Species: E. marcellus

Binomial name
- Eurytides marcellus (Cramer, 1777)
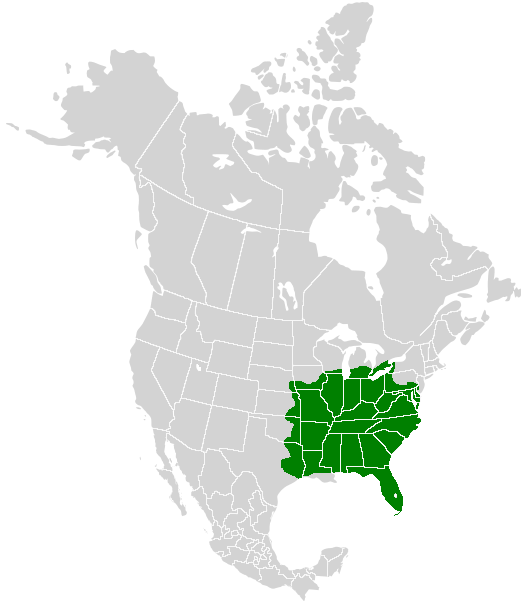

Synonyms
- Papilio ajax Linnaeus, 1758 (Suppressed); Papilio marcellus Cramer, 1777; Protographium marcellus (Cramer, 1777)

= Eurytides marcellus =

Zebra swallowtail

Species of butterfly

Eurytides marcellus, the zebra swallowtail (formerly listed under genera Protographium, Iphiclides, Graphium and Papilio by some authorities), is a swallowtail butterfly native to the eastern United States and south-eastern Canada. It is the state butterfly of Tennessee. Its distinctive wing shape and long tails make it easy to identify, and its black-and-white-striped pattern is reminiscent of a zebra. The butterflies are closely associated with pawpaws, and are rarely found far from these trees. The green or black caterpillars feed on the leaves of various pawpaw species, while the adults feed on flower nectar and minerals from damp soil.

== Description ==
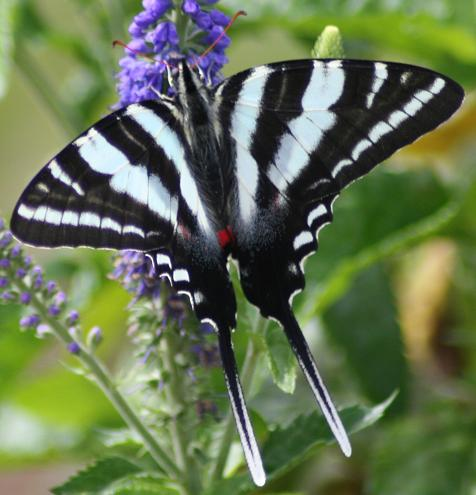
Summer form

The zebra swallowtail has a wingspan of 6.4 to 10.4 cm (2.5 to 4.1 in). The triangular wings are white to greenish white with black longitudinal stripes. A pair of swordlike tails extend from the hindwings. The inner margin of the hindwing has two blue spots on the corner and a red spot near the body. A red stripe runs along the middle of the ventral hindwing. P. marcellus has two seasonal forms, one occurring in the spring and the other in the summer. Spring forms are smaller, more white, and have short, black tails with white tips. Summer forms are larger, have broader black stripes, and longer, black tails with white edges.

== Flight period ==
The zebra swallowtail can be seen from late March to August in the northern portion of its range and from February to December in the southern portion. It has two broods in the north and three to four in the south, with the first brood being the most numerous.

== Behavior ==
Males will patrol near host plants in search of females, flying swiftly and directly. They usually fly 0.5 to 1.8 meters (1.6 to 5.9 ft) above the ground. Females will fly slowly when searching for suitable host plants. Both males and females avidly visit flowers, including species from the families Apocynaceae, Brassicaceae, Fabaceae, Lythraceae, Polemoniaceae, and Rosaceae. Males participate in a behavior known as puddling, in which individuals congregate on sand, gravel, or moist soil to obtain salts and amino acids. These nutrients aid the male in reproduction. Other food sources include rotting fruit and urine.

== Life cycle ==
Since the caterpillars are cannibalistic, females lay their eggs singly on pawpaw leaves or on the tree trunks. The round egg is pale green, later turning orange brown. Young caterpillars are black with lighter colored transverse stripes. Older larvae have two color forms. The more common form is green with yellow and white transverse stripes; the rarer form is black and banded with white and orange. In both forms, between the swollen thorax and the abdomen, there is a yellow, black, and bluish-white band. The larva has a yellow, foul-smelling, forked gland called an osmeterium which it will use to deter predators, especially spiders and ants. The chrysalis is either green or brown, and is more compact compared to chrysalids in the genus Papilio. Three small horns project from the head and thorax. The chrysalis hibernates in areas of its range with cold winters.

Life cycle
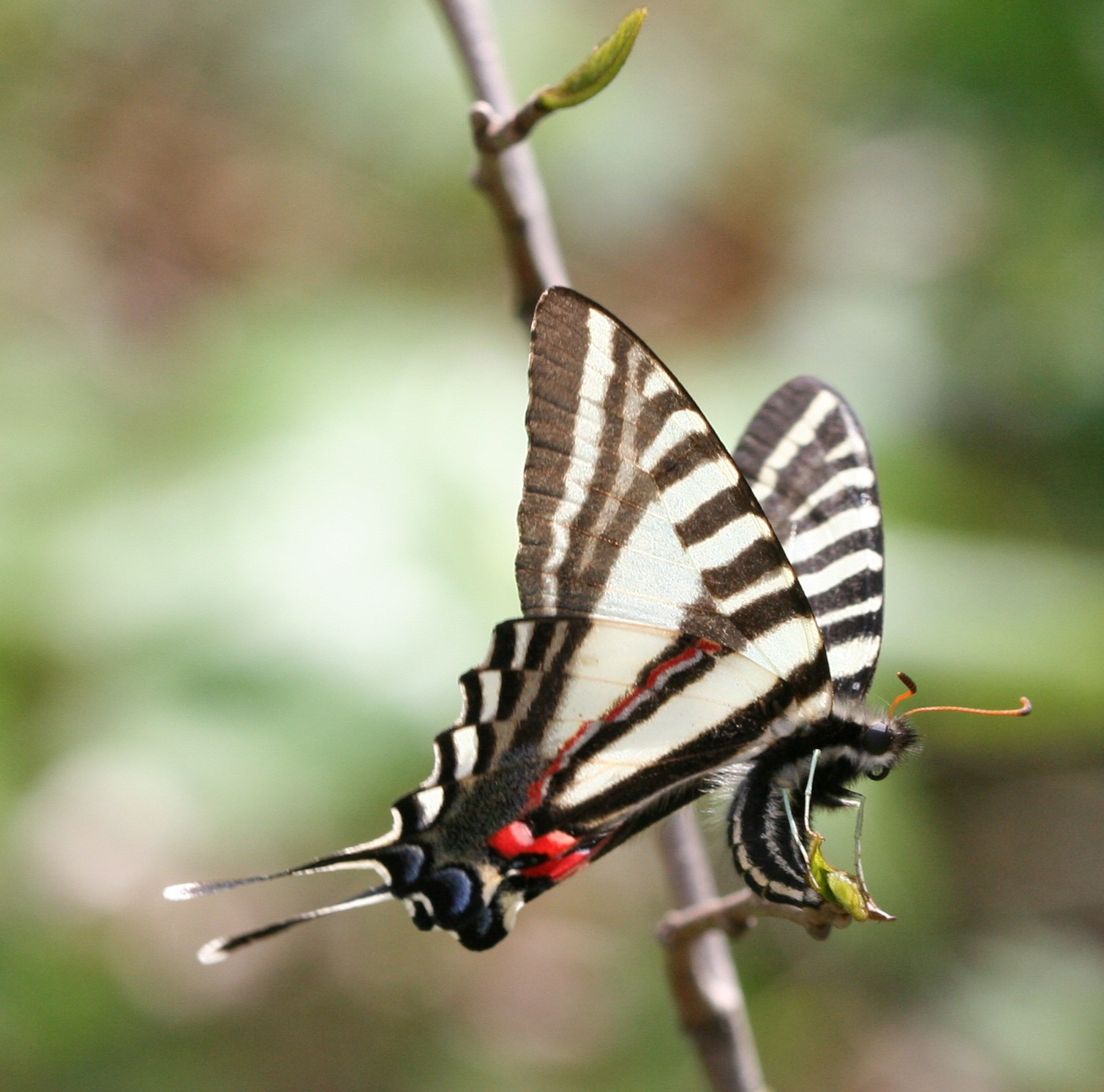
Female P. marcellus laying an egg on common pawpaw

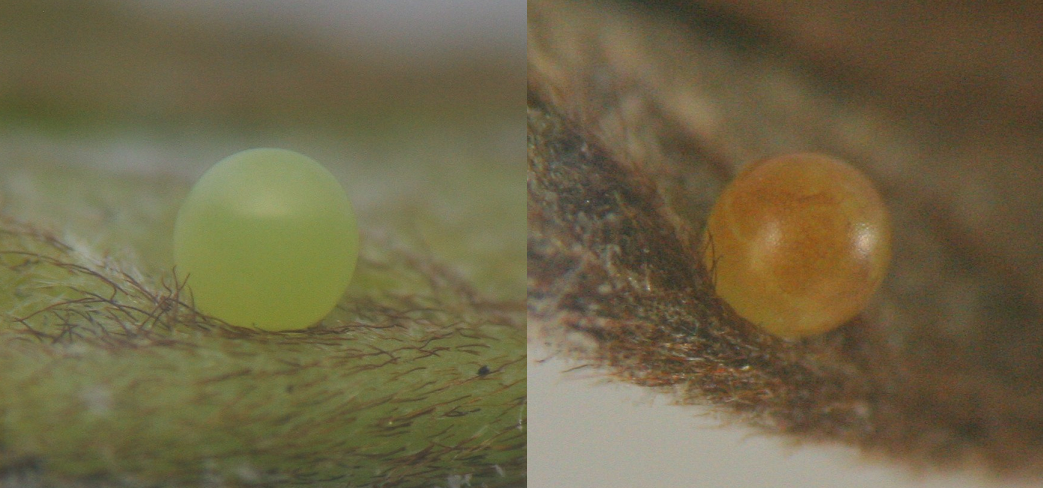
An egg on a host plant leaf. On the left, the egg is one day old; on the right, it is three days old.

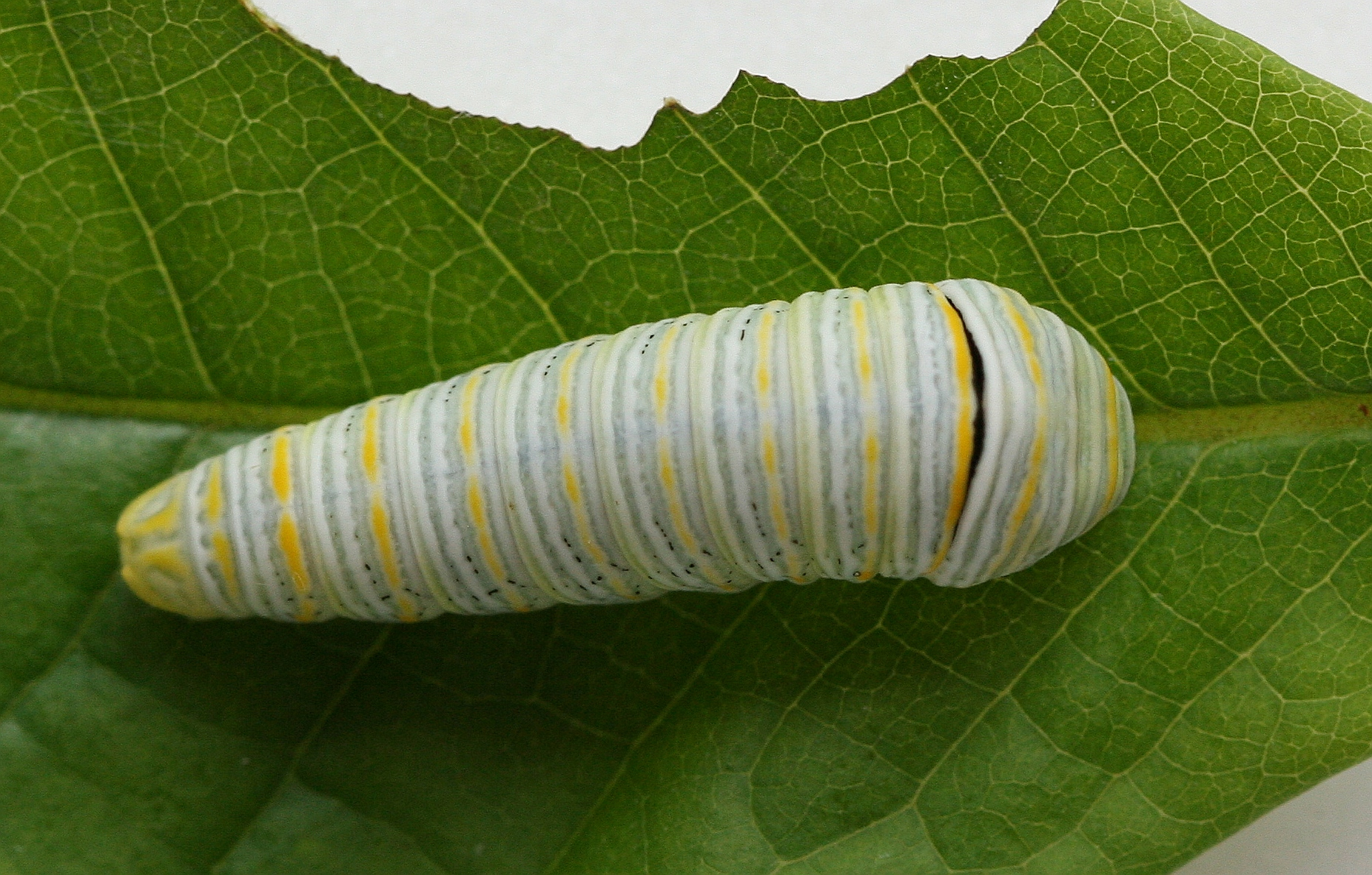
A green form larva

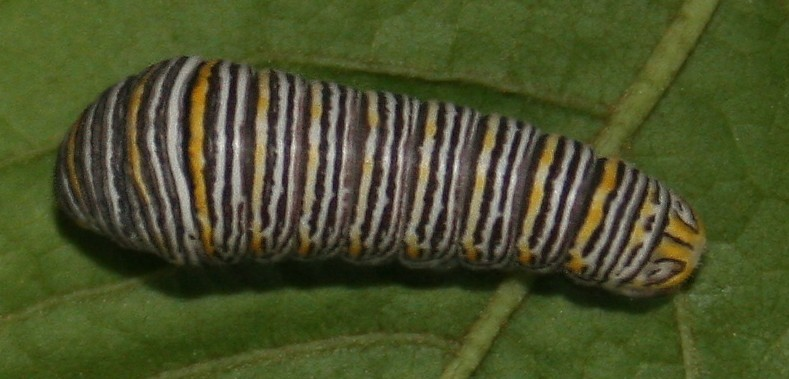
A black form larva

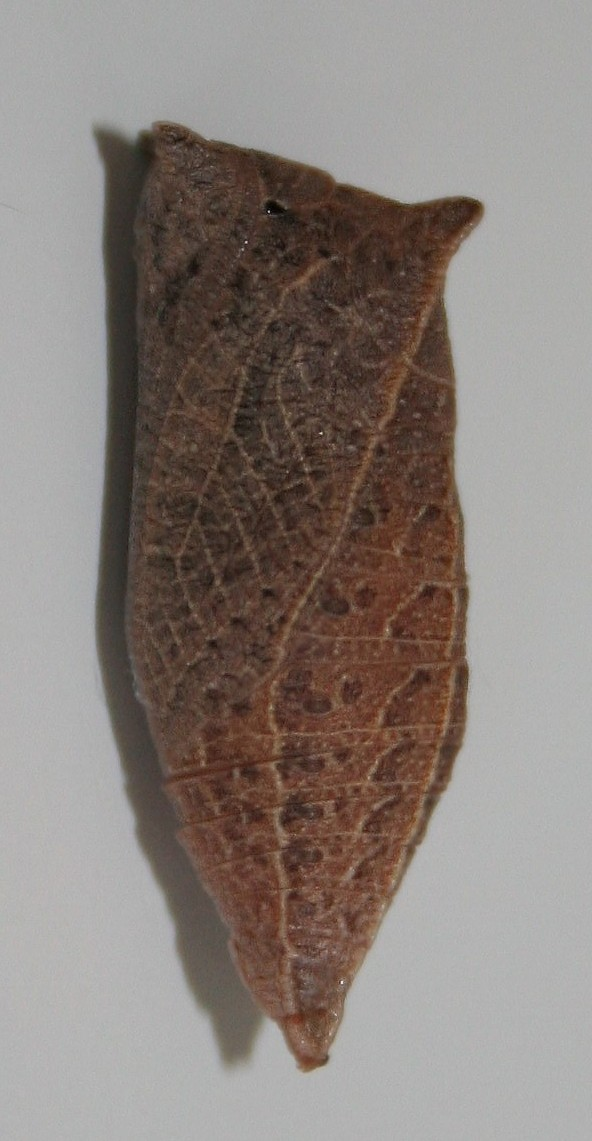
Lateral side of a chrysalis

== Host plants ==
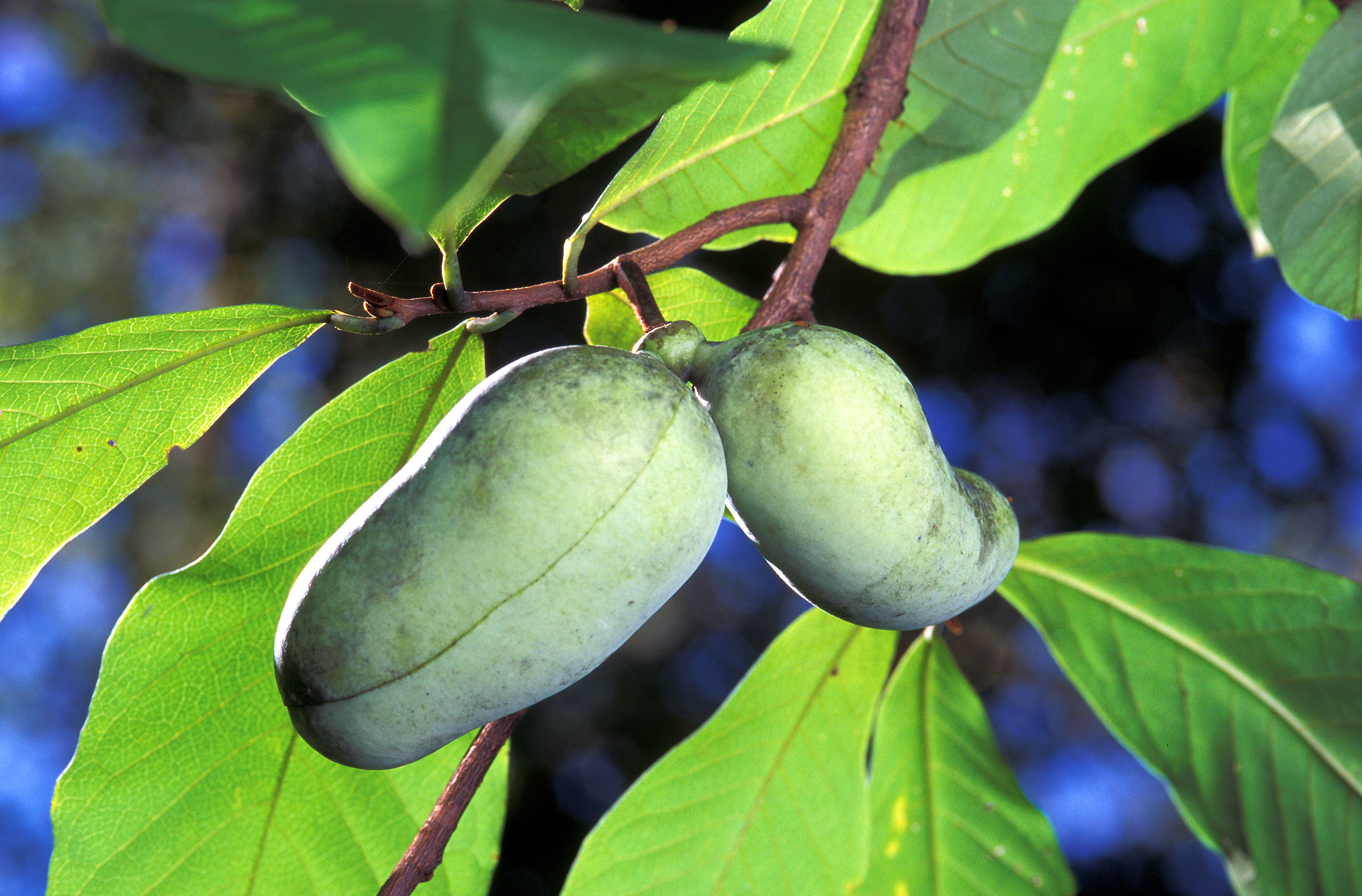
Asimina triloba, a host plant of the zebra swallowtail

The zebra swallowtail caterpillar feeds on species within the genus Asimina and was found to also accept, oviposit and grow on leaves of the related tropical soursop- Annona muricata in 1998. Commonly used species include Asimina angustifolia (slimleaf pawpaw), A. incana (woolly pawpaw), A. parviflora (smallflower pawpaw), A. reticulata (netted pawpaw), A. tetramera (four-petal pawpaw), and A. triloba (common pawpaw). P. marcellus caterpillars ingest neurotoxic chemicals called annonaceous acetogenins from their host plants, which are retained in the body tissues of both the caterpillar and the adult, and may help chemically protect the butterfly from birds.

Residents of Pittsburgh, Pennsylvania began planting pawpaw with the aim of encouraging the zebra swallowtail to return to its once-northernmost range. Success was documented in 2024. A zebra swallowtail was identified in 2025 in High Park, Toronto, Canada, near the northern tip of its historic range, for the first time since 1896.
