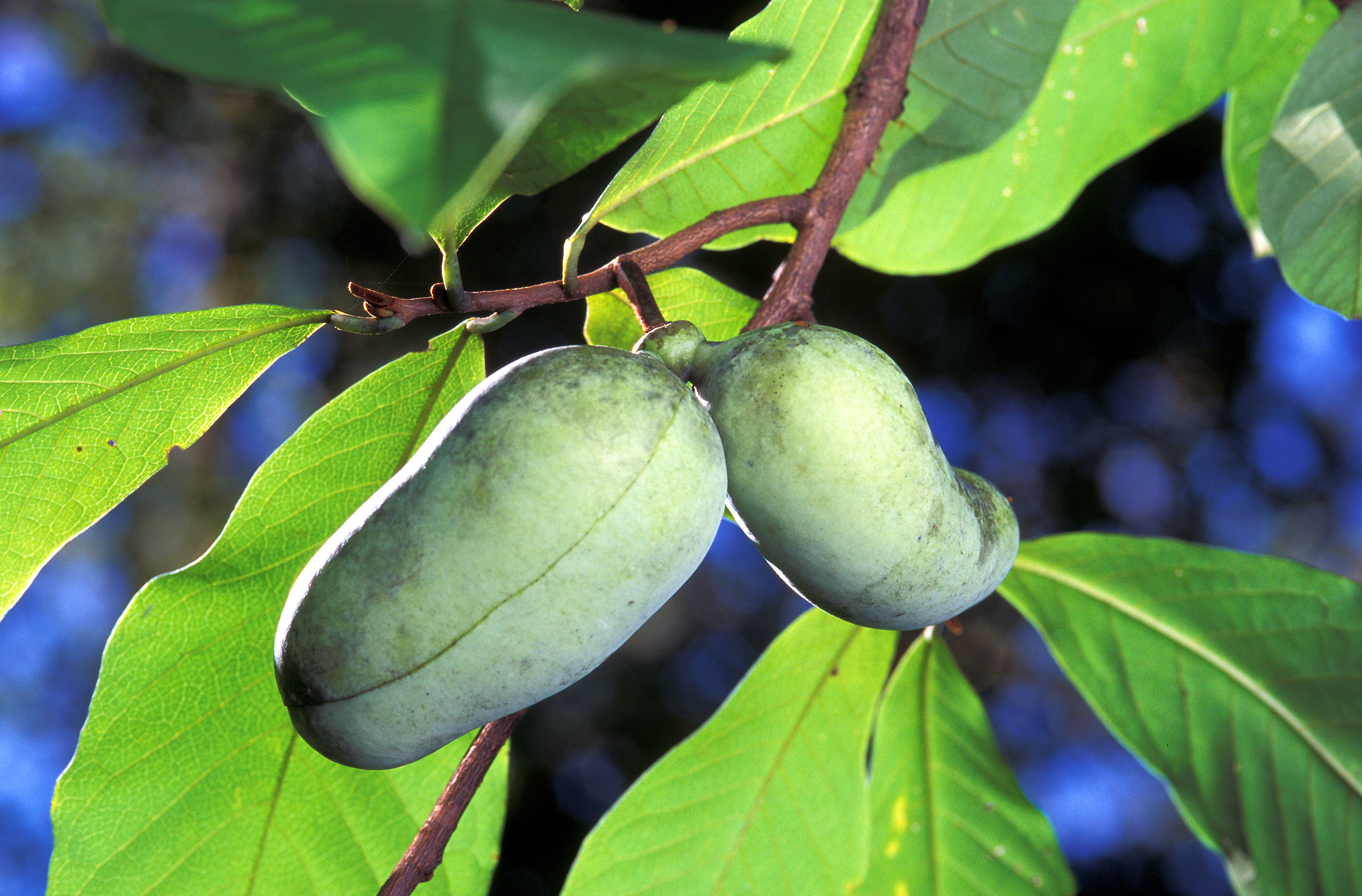
- Asimina triloba (common pawpaw) in fruit

Scientific classification
- Kingdom: Plantae
- Clade: Tracheophytes
- Clade: Angiosperms
- Clade: Magnoliids
- Order: Magnoliales
- Family: Annonaceae
- Subfamily: Annonoideae
- Genus: Asimina; Adans. (1763)

Type species
- Asimina triloba (L.) Dunal

Synonyms
- Deeringothamnus Small (1924); Orchidocarpum Michx. (1803); Pityothamnus Small (1933)

= Asimina =

North American genus of fruit trees

Asimina is a genus of small trees or shrubs described as a genus in 1763. Asimina is the only temperate genus in the tropical and subtropical flowering plant family Annonaceae. Asimina have large, simple leaves and large fruit. It is native to eastern North America and collectively referred to as pawpaw. (Unrelated plants also called "pawpaw" include the papaya (Carica papaya) and the mountain pawpaw (Vasconcellea pubescens).) Asimina includes the widespread common pawpaw A. triloba, which bears the largest edible fruit indigenous to the United States. Pawpaws are native to 26 states of the U.S. and to Ontario in Canada. The common pawpaw is a patch-forming (clonal) understory tree found in well-drained, deep, fertile bottomland and hilly upland habitat. Pawpaws are in the same plant family (Annonaceae) as the custard apple, cherimoya, sweetsop, soursop, and ylang-ylang; the genus is the only member of that family not confined to the tropics. Fossils date to the Cretaceous.

== Names ==
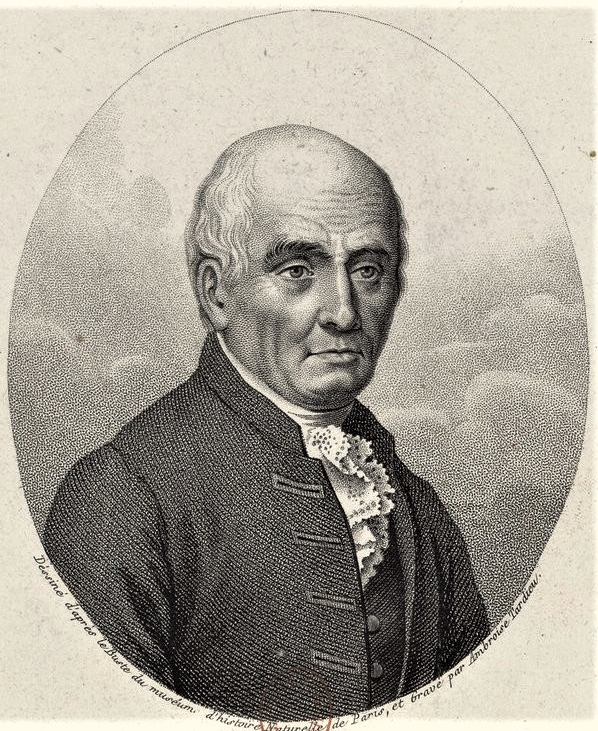
Michel Adanson (1727–1806), who named the genus Asimina

The genus name Asimina was first described and named by Michel Adanson, a French naturalist of Scottish descent. The name is adapted from a Native American term of unknown origin, assimin, through the French colonial asiminier.

The common name "(American) pawpaw", also spelled "paw paw", "paw-paw", and "papaw", probably derives from the Spanish papaya (itself probably from Arawakan), perhaps because of the superficial similarity of their fruits.

== Description ==
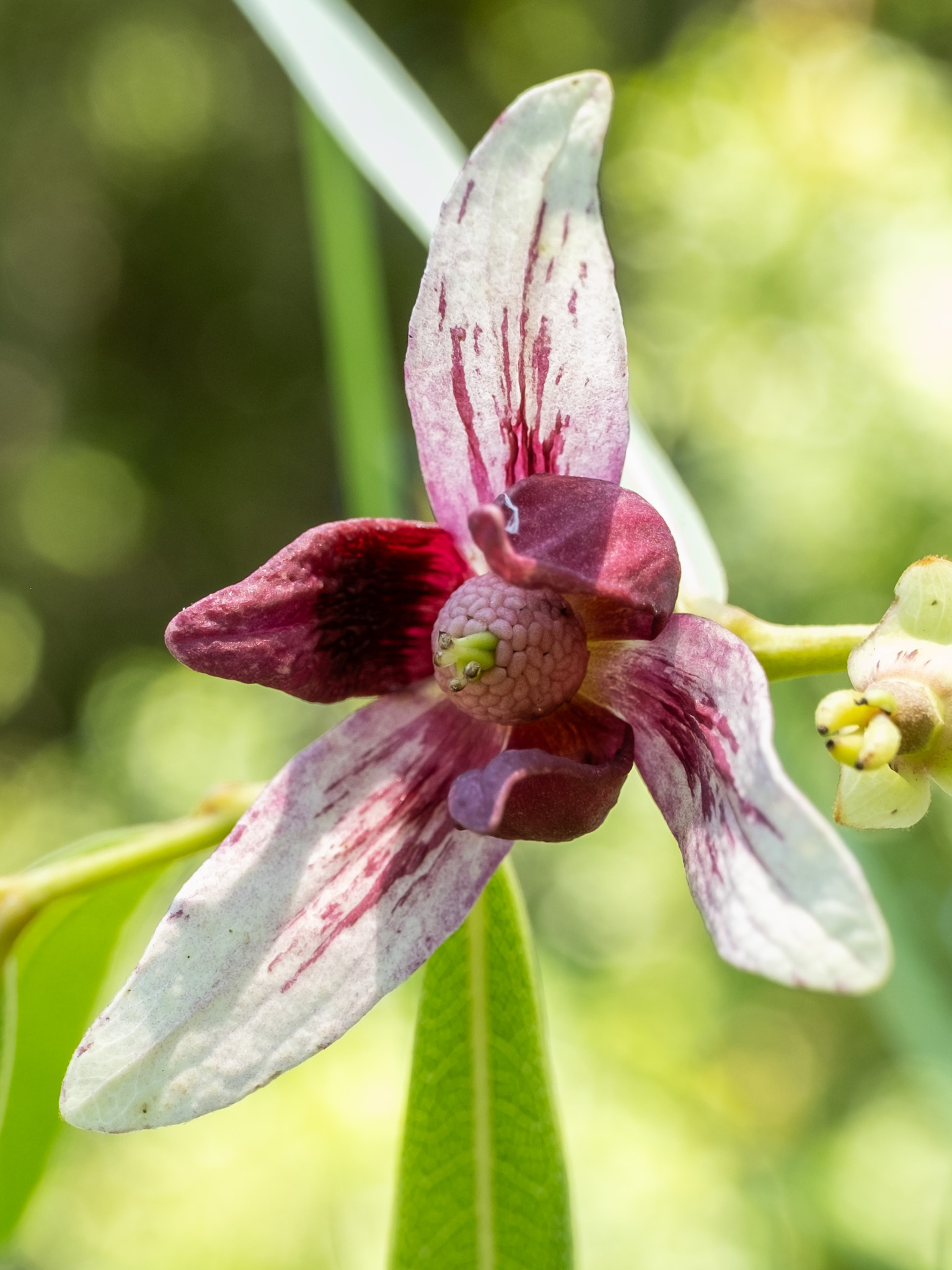
Flower of a natural hybrid Asimina from Gainesville, FL

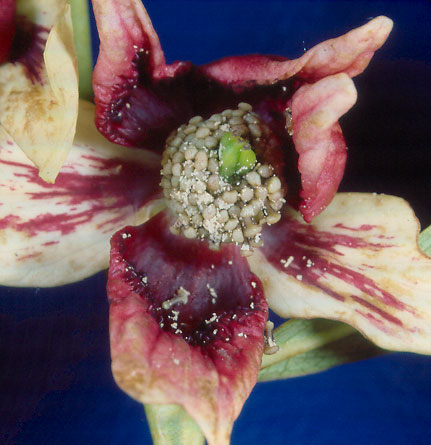
Flower of Asimina reticulata

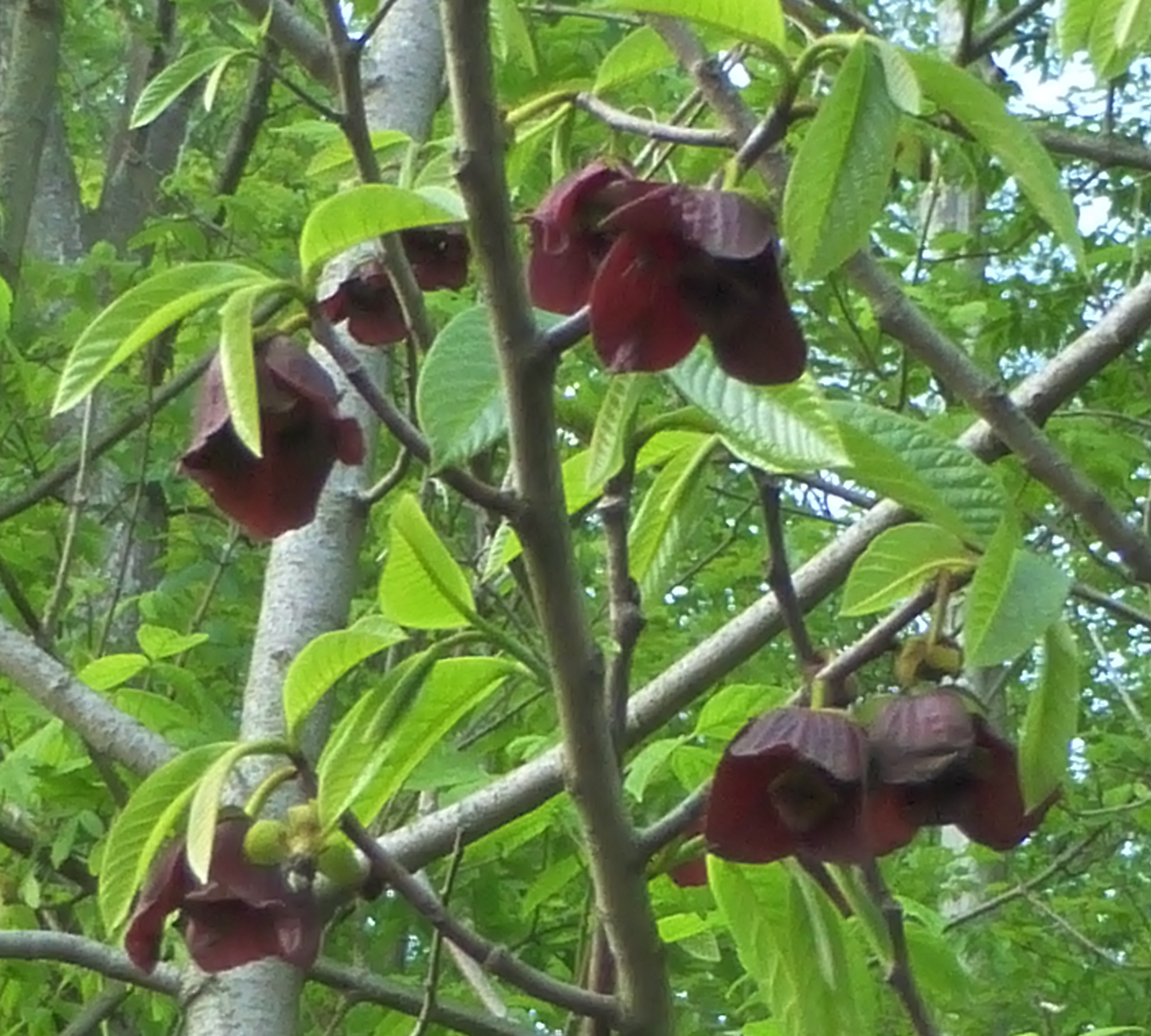
Flower of A. triloba

Pawpaws are shrubs or small trees to 2–12 m (6.6–39.4 ft) tall. The northern, cold-tolerant common pawpaw (A. triloba) is deciduous, while the southern species are often evergreen.

The leaves are alternate, obovate, entire, 20–35 cm (7.9–13.8 in) long and 10–15 cm (3.9–5.9 in) broad.

The flowers of pawpaws are produced singly or in clusters of up to eight together; they are large, 4–6 cm across, perfect, with three sepals and six petals (three large outer petals, three smaller inner petals). The petal color varies from white to purple or red-brown. Pawpaw flowers are noted to smell like fermenting grapes, or rotting food.

The fruit of the common pawpaw is a large, edible berry, 5–16 cm (2.0–6.3 in) long and 3–7 cm (1.2–2.8 in) broad, weighing from 20–500 g (0.71–17.64 oz), with numerous seeds; it is green when unripe, maturing to yellow or brown. It has a flavor somewhat similar to both banana and mango, varying significantly by cultivar, and has more protein than most fruits.

== Species and their distributions ==
11 species and several natural interspecies hybrids are accepted.

- Asimina angustifolia Raf. 1840 not A. Gray 1886 – Florida, Georgia, Alabama, South Carolina Regarded as a synonym of A. longifolia by some authorities.
- Asimina × bethanyensis DeLaney
- Asimina × colorata DeLaney
- Asimina incana (W.Bartram) Exell – woolly pawpaw. Florida and Georgia. (Annona incana W. Bartram)
- Asimina longifolia Raf. – slimleaf pawpaw. Florida, Georgia, and Alabama.
- Asimina × kralii DeLaney
- Asimina manasota DeLaney – Manasota papaw native to two counties in Florida (Manatee + Sarasota); first described in 2010 Not recognized by some authorities.
- Asimina × nashii Kral
- Asimina × oboreticulata DeLaney
- Asimina obovata (Willd.) Nash) (Annona obovata Willd.) – Flag-pawpaw or Bigflower pawpaw – Florida
- Asimina parviflora (Michx.) Dunal – smallflower pawpaw. Southern states from Texas to Virginia.
- Asimina × peninsularis DeLaney
- Asimina × piedmontana C.N.Horn
- Asimina pulchella (Small) Rehder & Dayton – white squirrel banana. Endemic to 3 counties in Florida. (endangered)
- Asimina pygmaea (W.Bartram) Dunal – dwarf pawpaw. Florida and Georgia.
- Asimina reticulata Shuttlw. ex Chapman – netted pawpaw. Florida and Georgia.
- Asimina rugelii B.L.Rob. – yellow squirrel banana. Endemic to Volusia county Florida (endangered)
- Asimina spatulata (Kral) D.B.Ward – slimleaf pawpaw. Florida and Alabama Regarded as a synonym by some authorities.
- Asimina tetramera Small – fourpetal pawpaw. Florida (endangered)
- Asimina triloba (L.) Dunal – common pawpaw. Extreme southern Ontario, Canada, and the eastern United States from New York west to southeast Nebraska, and south to northern Florida and eastern Texas. (Annona triloba L.)

== Ecology ==
The common pawpaw is native to shady, rich bottom lands, where it often forms a dense undergrowth in the forest, often appearing as a patch or thicket of individual, small, slender trees.

Pawpaw flowers are insect-pollinated, but fruit production is limited since few if any pollinators are attracted to the flower's faint, or sometimes nonexistent scent. The flowers produce an odor similar to that of rotting meat to attract blowflies or carrion beetles for cross pollination. Other insects that are attracted to pawpaw plants include scavenging fruit flies, carrion flies and beetles. Because of difficult pollination, some believe the flowers are self-incompatible.

Pawpaw fruit may be eaten by foxes, opossums, squirrels, and raccoons. Pawpaw leaves and twigs are seldom consumed by rabbits or deer.

The leaves, twigs, and bark of the common pawpaw tree contain natural insecticides known as acetogenins.

Larvae of the zebra swallowtail butterfly feed exclusively on young leaves of the various pawpaw species, but never occur in great numbers on the plants.

The pawpaw is considered an evolutionary anachronism, where a now-extinct evolutionary partner, such as a Pleistocene megafauna species, formerly consumed the fruit and assisted in seed dispersal.

== Cultivation and uses ==
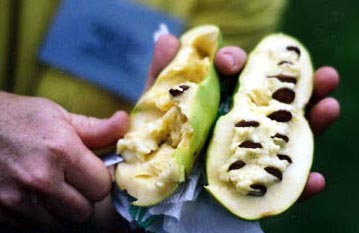
Asimina triloba is often called "prairie banana" because of its banana-like, creamy texture and flavor.

Wild-collected fruits of the common pawpaw (A. triloba) have long been a popular treat throughout the tree's extensive native range in eastern North America. Pawpaws have never been widely cultivated for fruit, but interest in pawpaw cultivation has increased in recent decades. Fresh pawpaw fruits are commonly eaten raw; however, once ripe they store only a few days at room temperature and do not ship well unless frozen. Other methods of preservation include dehydration, production of jams or jellies, and pressure canning. The fruit pulp is also often used locally in baked dessert recipes, with pawpaw often substituted in a number of banana-based recipes.

The common pawpaw is of interest in ecological restoration plantings, since this tree grows well in wet soil and has a strong tendency to form well-rooted clonal thickets.

== History ==
The earliest documentation of pawpaws is in the 1541 report of the Spanish de Soto expedition, who found Native Americans cultivating it east of the Mississippi River. Chilled pawpaw fruit was a favorite dessert of George Washington, and Thomas Jefferson planted it at his home in Virginia, Monticello. The Lewis and Clark Expedition sometimes subsisted on pawpaws during their travels. Daniel Boone was also a consumer and fan of the pawpaw. The common pawpaw was designated as the Ohio state native fruit in 2009. Multiple pawpaw festivals have celebrated the plant and its fruit.
