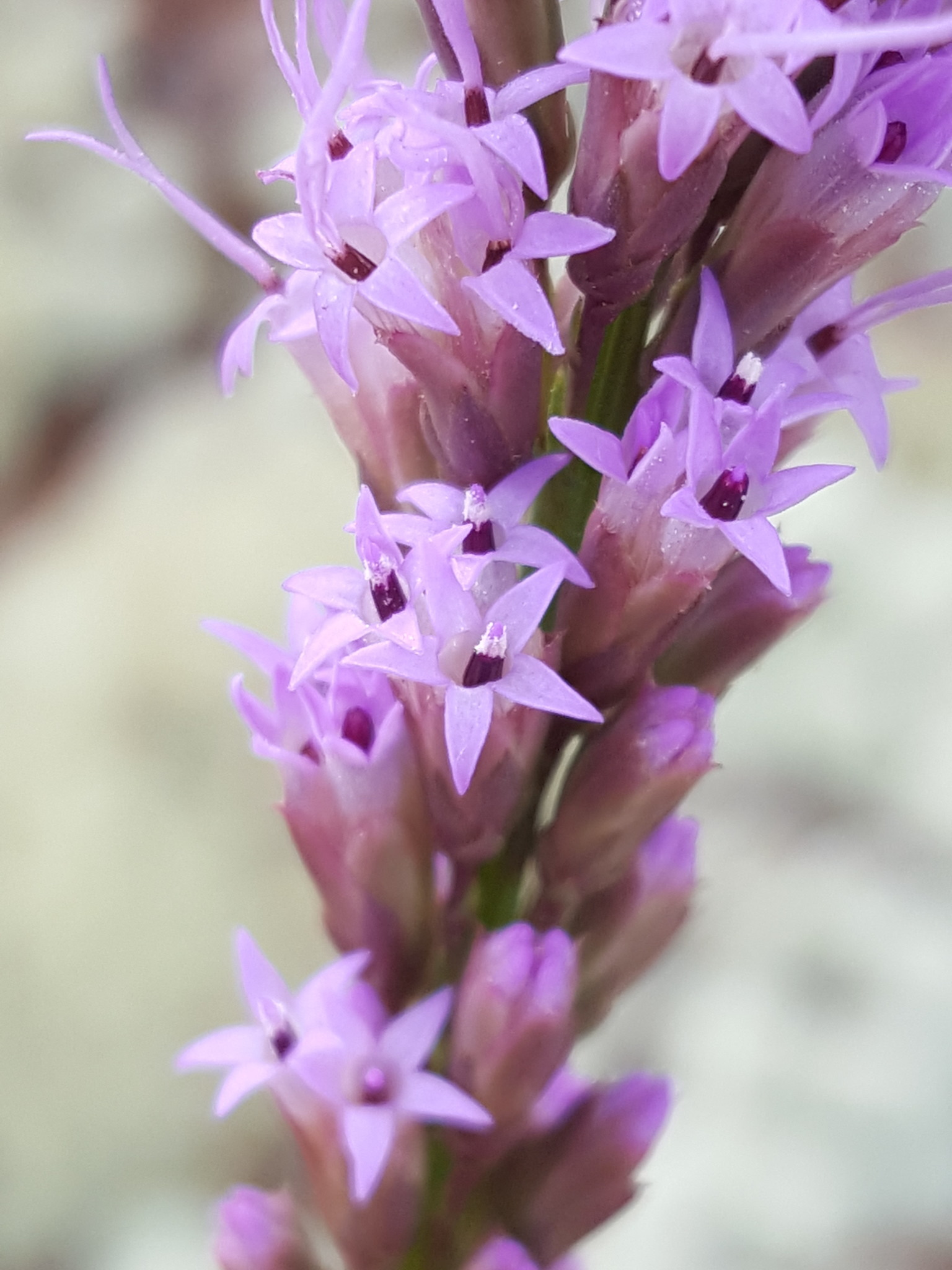

Conservation status
- Unranked (NatureServe)

Scientific classification
- Kingdom: Plantae
- Clade: Tracheophytes
- Clade: Angiosperms
- Clade: Eudicots
- Clade: Asterids
- Order: Asterales
- Family: Asteraceae
- Genus: Liatris
- Species: L. laevigata

Binomial name
- Liatris laevigata Nutt.

Synonyms
- Lacinaria laevigata Small; Liatris tenuifolia var. laevigata B.L.Rob.

= Liatris laevigata =

Species of plant

Liatris laevigata, the clusterleaf blazing star, is a species of flowering plant in the family Asteraceae, native to the U.S. states of Georgia and Florida. It usually is found growing in sandy areas in association with sclerophyllous oaks.

It may occasionally be grouped in Liatris tenuifolia as L. tenuifolia var. quadriflora, where it is differentiated by its larger basal leaves.
