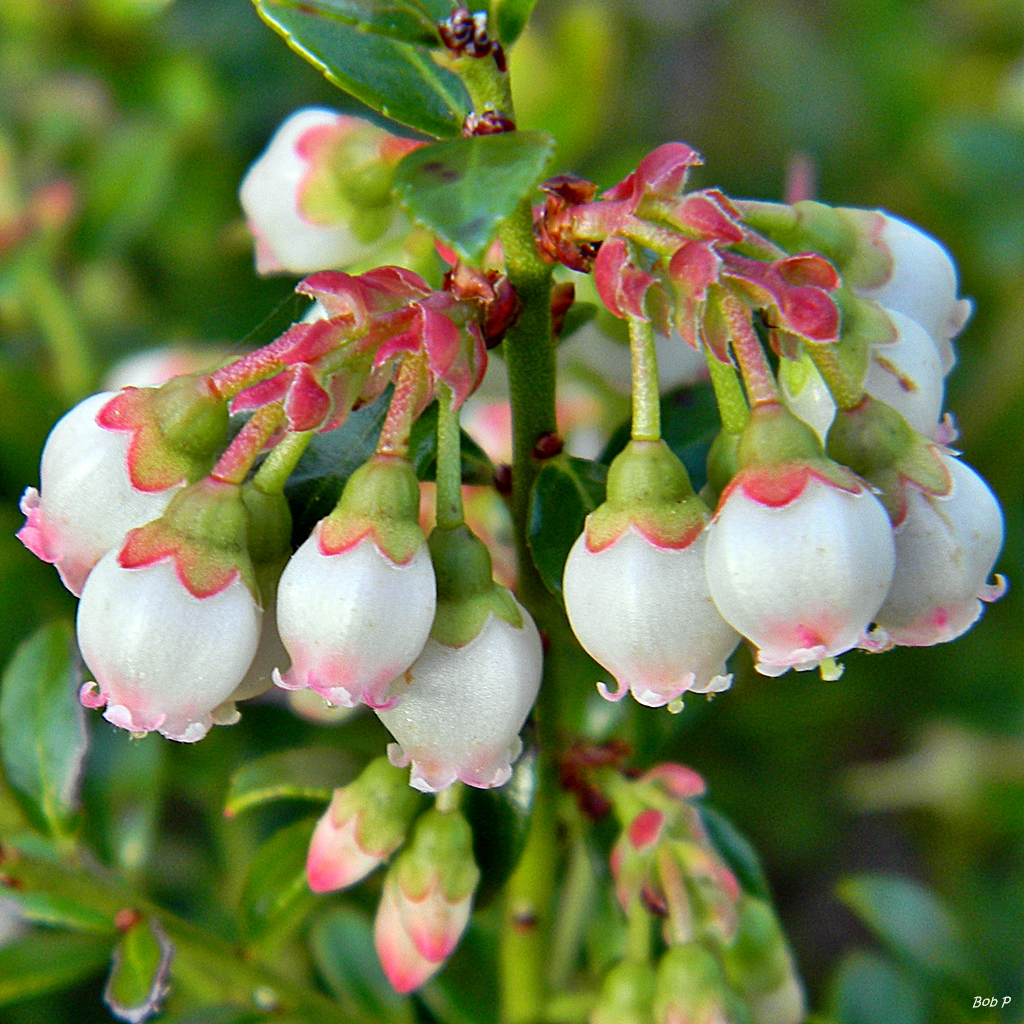

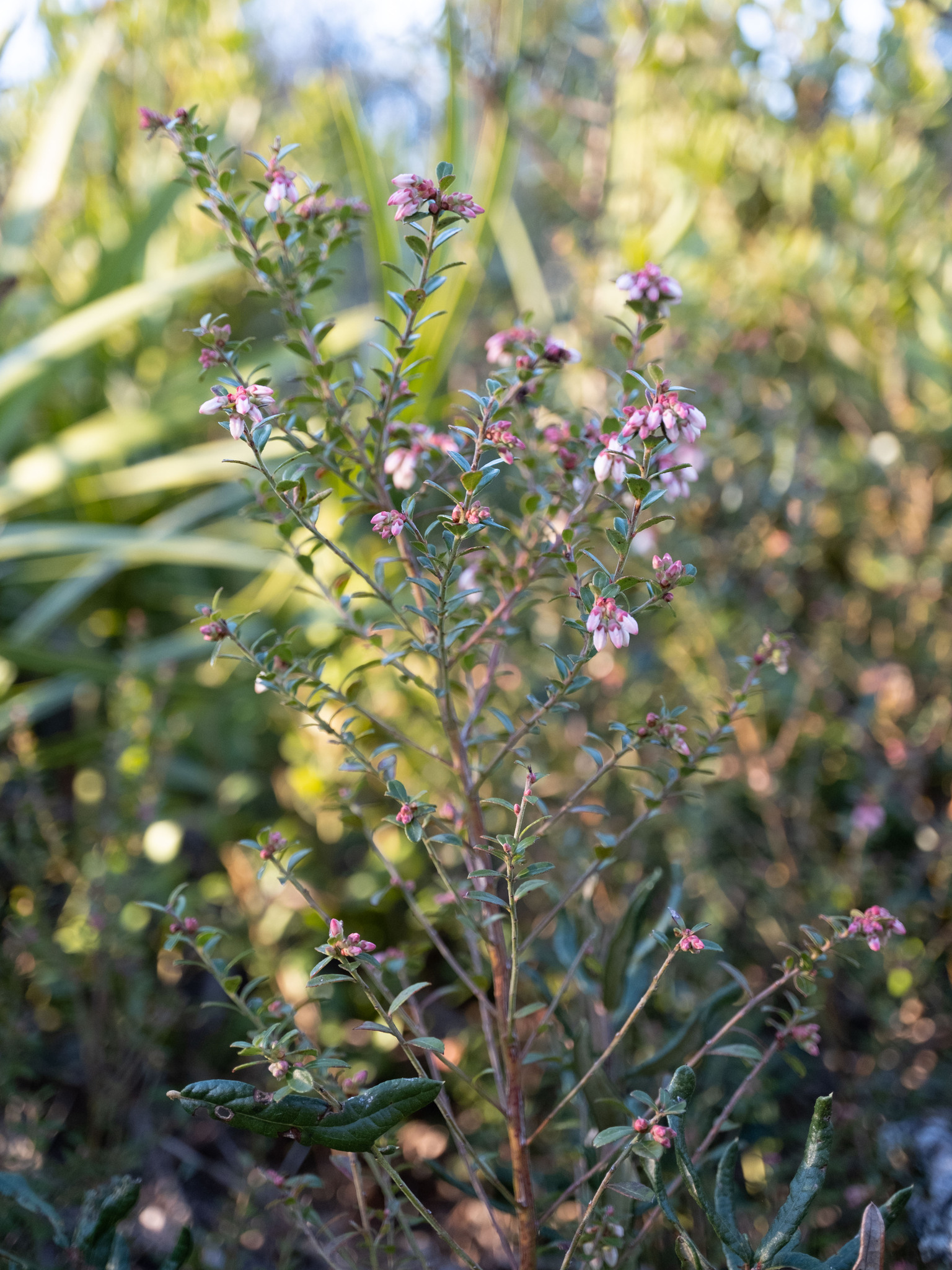

Conservation status
- Secure (NatureServe)

Scientific classification
- Kingdom: Plantae
- Clade: Embryophytes
- Clade: Tracheophytes
- Clade: Spermatophytes
- Clade: Angiosperms
- Clade: Eudicots
- Clade: Asterids
- Order: Ericales
- Family: Ericaceae
- Genus: Vaccinium
- Section: Vaccinium sect. Cyanococcus
- Species: V. myrsinites

Binomial name
- Vaccinium myrsinites Lam.

Synonyms
- Cyanococcus myrsinites (Lamarck) Small; Vaccinium nitidum Andrews

= Vaccinium myrsinites =

Berry and plant

Vaccinium myrsinites is a North American species of flowering plant in the heath family known by the common name shiny blueberry.

== Description ==
Vaccinium myrsinites is an erect, branching shrub that reaches 1 metre (3 1/2 feet) in maximum height. It is rhizomatous and can form very large colonies. Colonies measuring 1 kilometre (0.62 miles) across and over 1,000 years old have been observed. It is generally evergreen, but some forms are deciduous. The stems have angular green twigs. The leathery, green or grayish green, oval leaves are up to roughly 1 centimetre (3/8 inch) long and have smooth or vaguely toothed edges. The undersides are glandular.

The flowers are urn-shaped or cylindrical, white to pink or red-tinged, and borne in clusters of up to 8. They may be nearly one centimeter long. The fruit is a black or waxy blue berry up to 8 or 9 millimeters in length containing several seeds. It is diploid, with 48 total chromosomes.

== Taxonomy ==
Vaccinium myrsinites is likely a hybrid of two other blueberry species, small cluster blueberry and Darrow's evergreen blueberry. Individuals may resemble one or the other parent species; the "darrowoid" phase is more common in coastal Florida, while the "tenneloid" phase can be found in southern Georgia and northern Florida. This species also hybridizes with many other blueberries.

== Distribution and habitat ==
The species is native to the southeastern United States, including Alabama, Georgia, South Carolina, and Florida. It may occur as far west as Louisiana.

It grows in several habitat types in the southeastern U.S., including prairies, pine barrens, bog margins, flatwoods, Florida scrub, palmetto communities, and rosemary balds. It also grows in disturbed, clearcut, and fallow cultivated areas. Associated plants include scrub palmetto, netted pawpaw, scrubclover, dodder, Florida blazingstar, scrub mint, tree sparkleberry, saw palmetto, Lyonia, dwarf huckleberry, inkberry, bracken fern, several oaks, many species of pine. The best sites are dry, sandy stretches of acidic soils in full sunlight.

== Ecology ==
In common with many southeastern scrub species, this plant is fire-adapted. It can recover from a fire by sprouting from its rhizome. This is also the way it forms vast colonies of cloned individuals. The plant also reproduces sexually by seed. The seeds are dispersed by animals, which relish the fruits.

== Uses ==
The Seminole used V. myrsinites for food and for a variety of ceremonial and medicinal purposes, including the treatment of "hog sickness", or unconsciousness.
