= Asimina manasota =

- Persisting in former sandhill that has since been converted to cattle rangeland

Conservation status
- Critically Imperiled (NatureServe)

Scientific classification
- Kingdom: Plantae
- Clade: Embryophytes
- Clade: Tracheophytes
- Clade: Angiosperms
- Clade: Magnoliids
- Order: Magnoliales
- Family: Annonaceae
- Genus: Asimina
- Species: A. manasota

Binomial name
- Asimina manasota Delaney

Species of flowering plant

Asimina manasota, commonly referred to as Manasota pawpaw, is a rare species of pawpaw endemic to Manatee and Sarasota counties in Florida, US.

== Habitat ==
It is known from turkey oak sandhill and xeric flatwoods, habitats which were once much more common around the head of the Manatee River.

== Conservation ==
It is now known from only a handful of remaining sites, two of them being protected, where there are an estimated 20 to 25 plants. Exceptional ex situ conservation efforts have been undertaken by Marie Selby Botanical Gardens and Cincinnati Zoo and Botanical Gardens, including cryopreservation and creation of tissue culture lines, as traditional seed banking methods are not viable for this species.

== Gallery ==
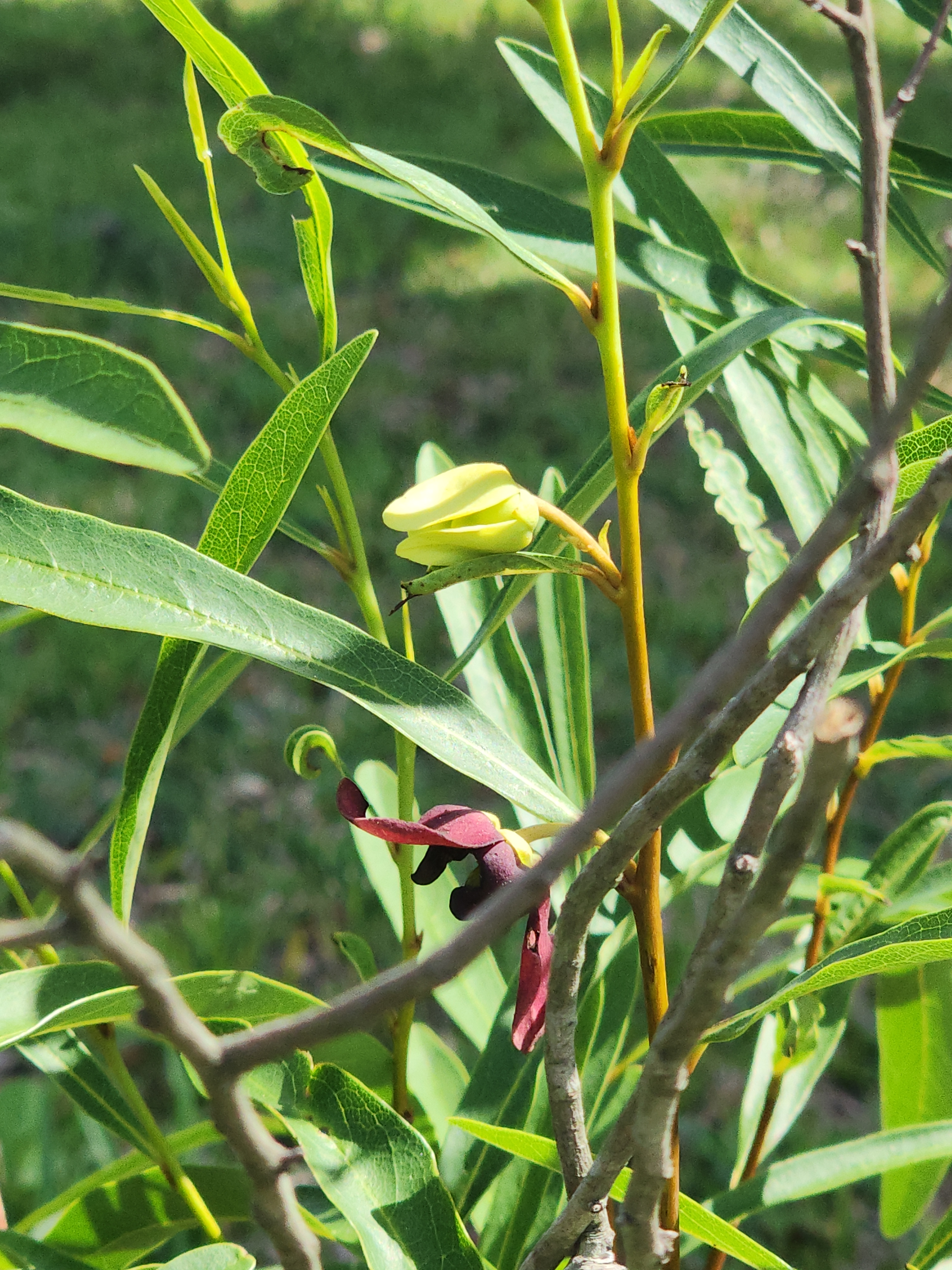

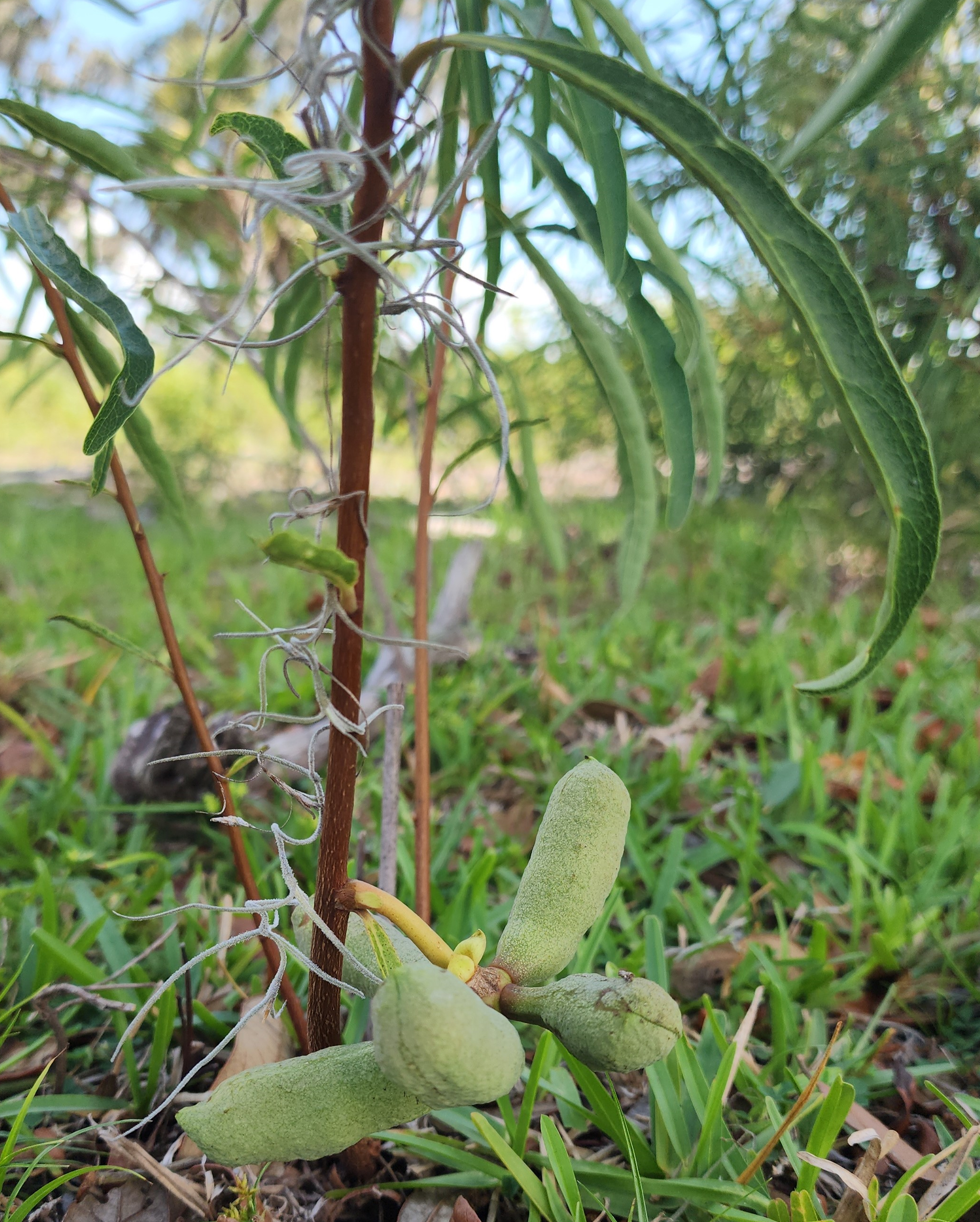
