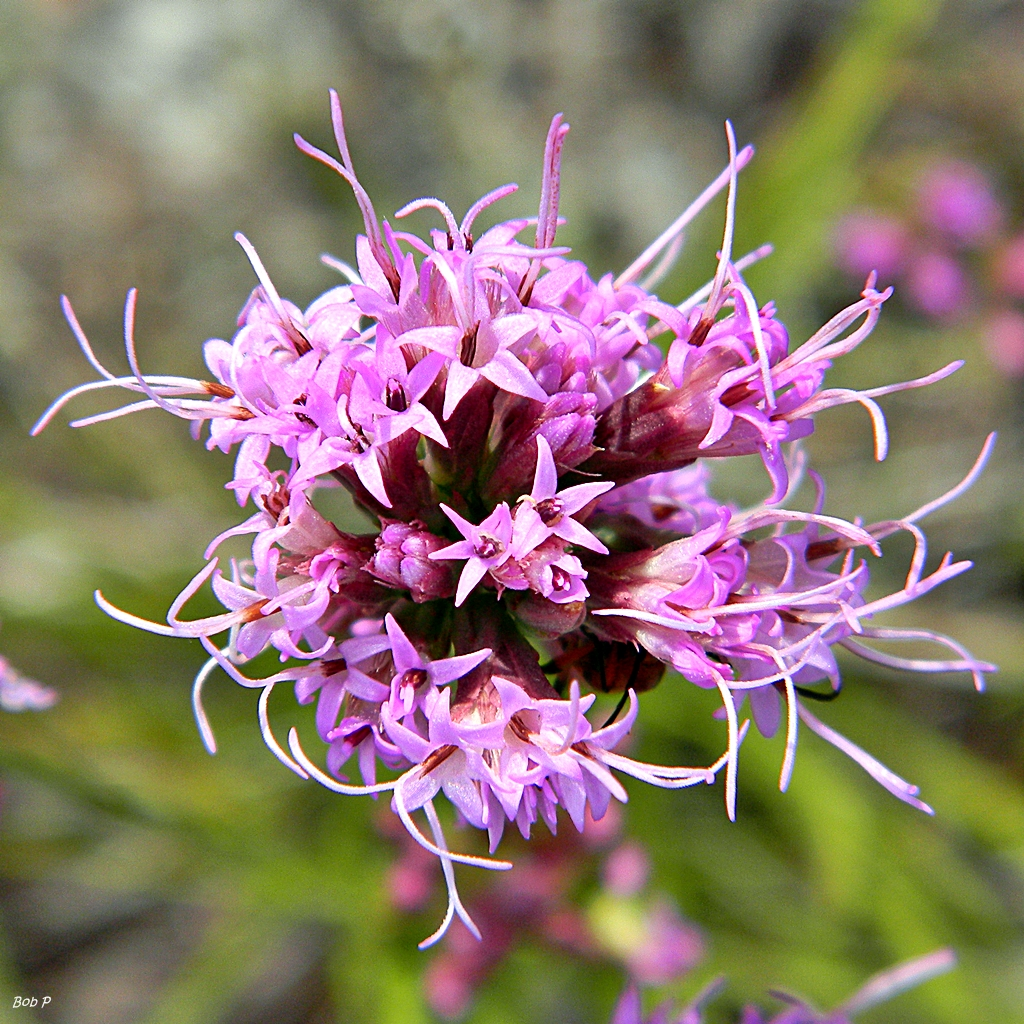
- Flowers of Liatris tenuifolia

Conservation status
- Apparently Secure (NatureServe)

Scientific classification
- Kingdom: Plantae
- Clade: Tracheophytes
- Clade: Angiosperms
- Clade: Eudicots
- Clade: Asterids
- Order: Asterales
- Family: Asteraceae
- Genus: Liatris
- Species: L. tenuifolia

Binomial name
- Liatris tenuifolia Nutt.

= Liatris tenuifolia =

Species of plant

Liatris tenuifolia, also known as the shortleaf gayfeather, is a species of the genus Liatris endemic to parts of the Southeast United States.

The flower blooms in mid to late fall and is dormant in the winter. It is lavender in color.

In spring, it begins to produce needle like leaves. L. tenuifolia has basal leaves ranging from four to ten inches (10 to 25 cm) long. L. tenuifolia var. quadriflora, sometimes split into Liatris laevigata, can be distinguished by its broad basal leaves. The stalk of the plant is two to five feet (0.61 to 1.52 m) tall.

Liatris tenuifolia inhabits oak woods, sand hills and dunes, longleaf pine savannas, and along roadsides. The species is native to the states of Florida, Alabama, South Carolina, and Georgia. The plant grows in sand.
