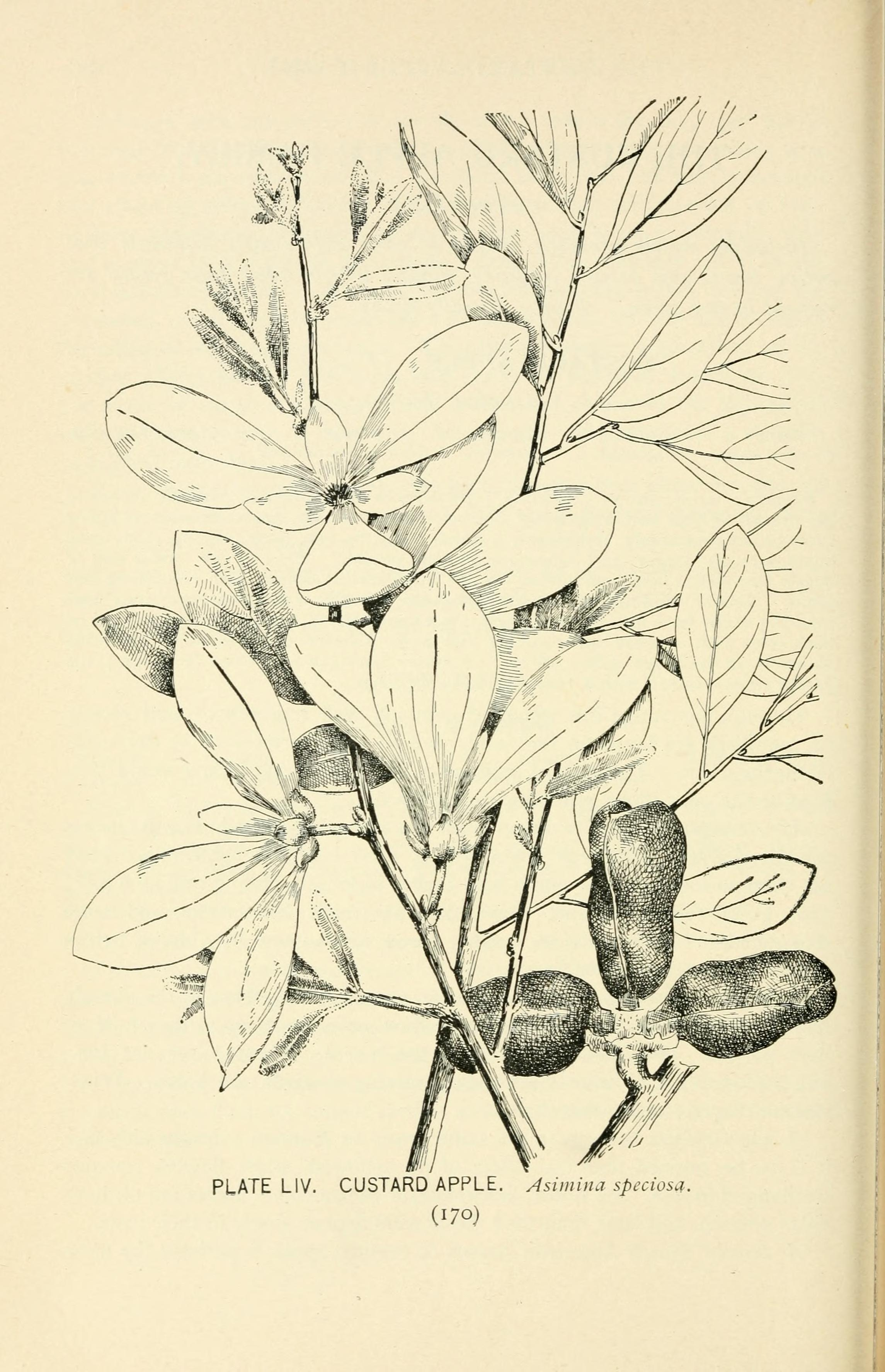

Conservation status
- Apparently Secure (NatureServe)

Scientific classification
- Kingdom: Plantae
- Clade: Tracheophytes
- Clade: Angiosperms
- Clade: Magnoliids
- Order: Magnoliales
- Family: Annonaceae
- Genus: Asimina
- Species: A. incana

Binomial name
- Asimina incana (W. Bartram) Exell

= Asimina incana =

Species of tree

Asimina incana, also known as the woolly pawpaw, is a species of pawpaw (genus Asimina, family Annonaceae). Its botanical synonyms include Asimina speciosa and Pityothamnus incanus.

== Description ==
This species is a shrub growing to a height of 1.5 metres (4 ft 11 in). Its leaves are 3–6 millimetres (0.12–0.24 in) long and leathery. The plant typically produces 1–4 flowers per node. Its pollen is shed as permanent tetrads.
