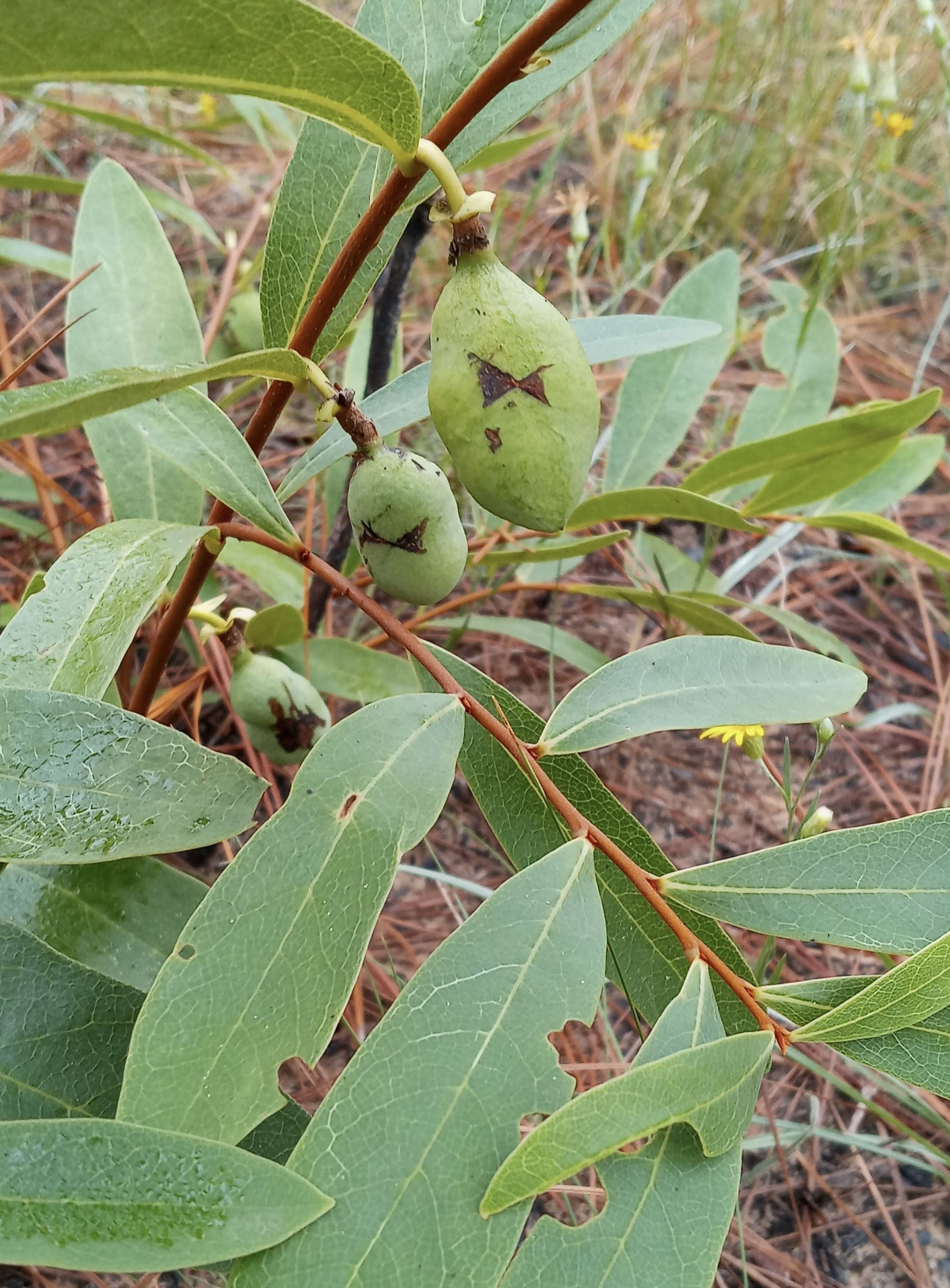
- Asimina pygmaea fruit

Conservation status
- Apparently Secure (NatureServe)

Scientific classification
- Kingdom: Plantae
- Clade: Tracheophytes
- Clade: Angiosperms
- Clade: Magnoliids
- Order: Magnoliales
- Family: Annonaceae
- Genus: Asimina
- Species: A. pygmaea

Binomial name
- Asimina pygmaea (W.Bartram) Dunal

Synonyms
- Annona pygmaea W.Bartram; Asimina secundiflora Shuttlew. ex Chapm. Orchidocarpum pygmaeum (W.Bartram) Michx. Pityothamnus pygmaeus (W.Bartram) Small; Unona pygmaea (W.Bartram) Walp. Uvaria pygmaea (W.Bartram) Torr. & A.Gray

= Asimina pygmaea =

Species of plant

Asimina pygmaea, the dwarf pawpaw or gopher berry, is a species of plant in the family Annonaceae. It is native to Florida and Georgia in the United States. William Bartram, the American naturalist who first formally described the species using the basionym Annona pygmaea, named it after its dwarfed (pygmaeus in Latin) stature.

== Description ==
It is a bush reaching 20–30 centimeters in height. It has a spindle-shaped taproot from which one or more branched, or unbranched shoots emerge. Its shoots have red to brown bark with lenticels. Its leathery leaves are 4–11 centimeters long and have rounded or blunt tips, occasionally with a notch. The margins of the leaves are rolled toward their underside. The leaves are dark green and hairless on their upper surface and paler on their underside with a networked pattern of veins. Its twisted petioles are 3–10 millimeters long. Its flowers are on thin, 1.5–4 centimeter long axillary peduncles. Its flowers are a brown-crimson color with a strong yeasty or rotting flesh smell. Its flowers have 6 petals, arranged in two rows of three. Its oblong to oval, fleshy, outer petals are 1.5–3 centimeters long and rolled downward toward their outer surface. Its fleshy, oval inner petals are 0.5–2 centimeters long, deeper in color than the outer petals. The base of the inner petals are swollen, and wrinkled on the inner surface. The tips of the inner petals are rolled back. The stamens are globular, 4–7 millimeters wide and light green to pink at maturity. Its flowers have 2–5 carpels. Its fruit are yellow-green, curved cylinders, 3–4 centimeters in length. The fruit have brown, shiny seeds, each 1 centimeter in length, arranged in two rows.

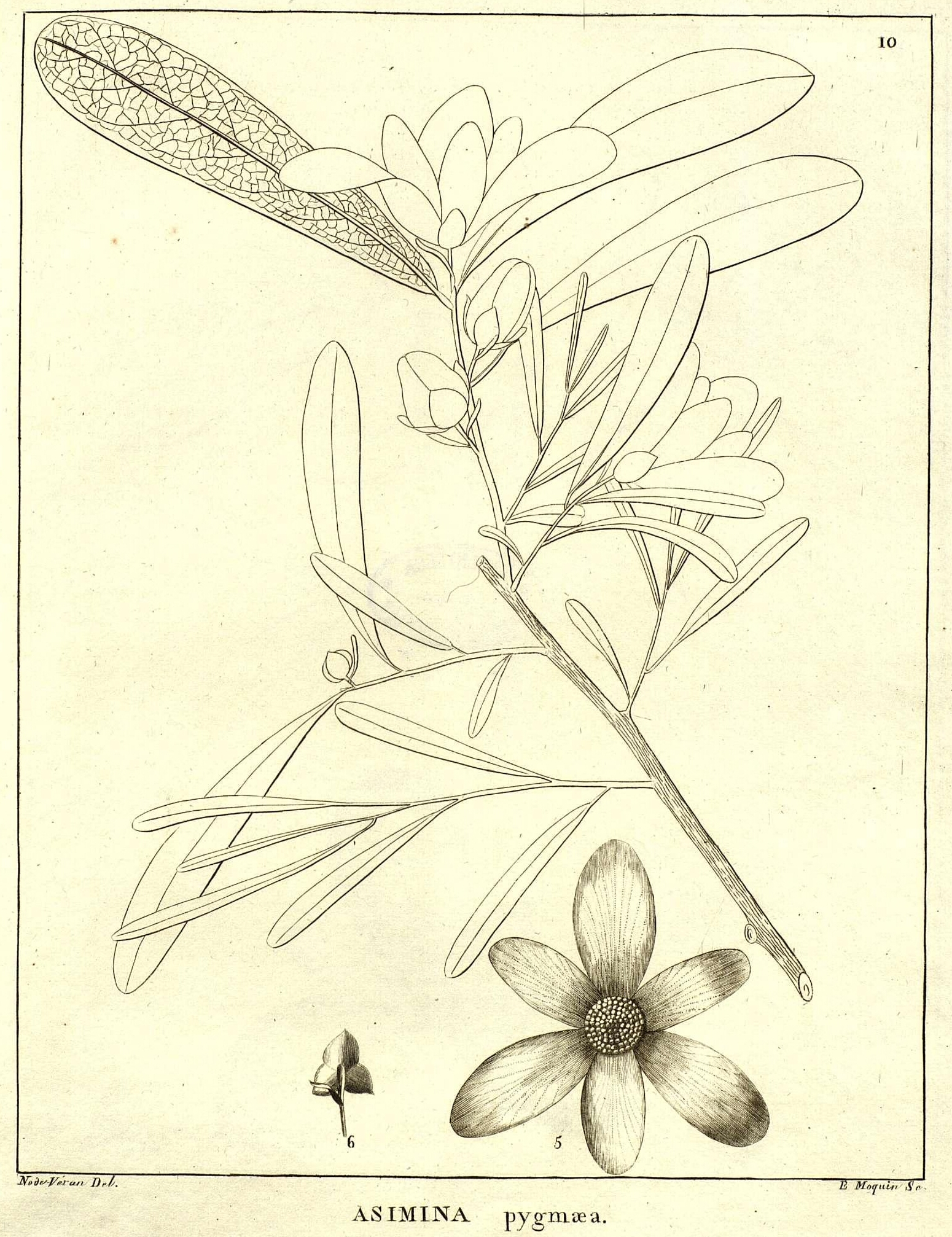
Botanical illustration of Asimina pygmaea

=== Reproductive biology ===
The pollen of Asimina pygmaea is shed as permanent tetrads. It is pollinated by the dark flower scarab beetle Euphoria sepulcralis. Its flowers produce several scent compounds including dimethyl sulfide which is associated with carrion odor and may attract beetle pollinators.

=== Habitat and distribution ===
It has been observed growing in well-drained sandy soils, in pine flatwoods, savannahs and old fields.
