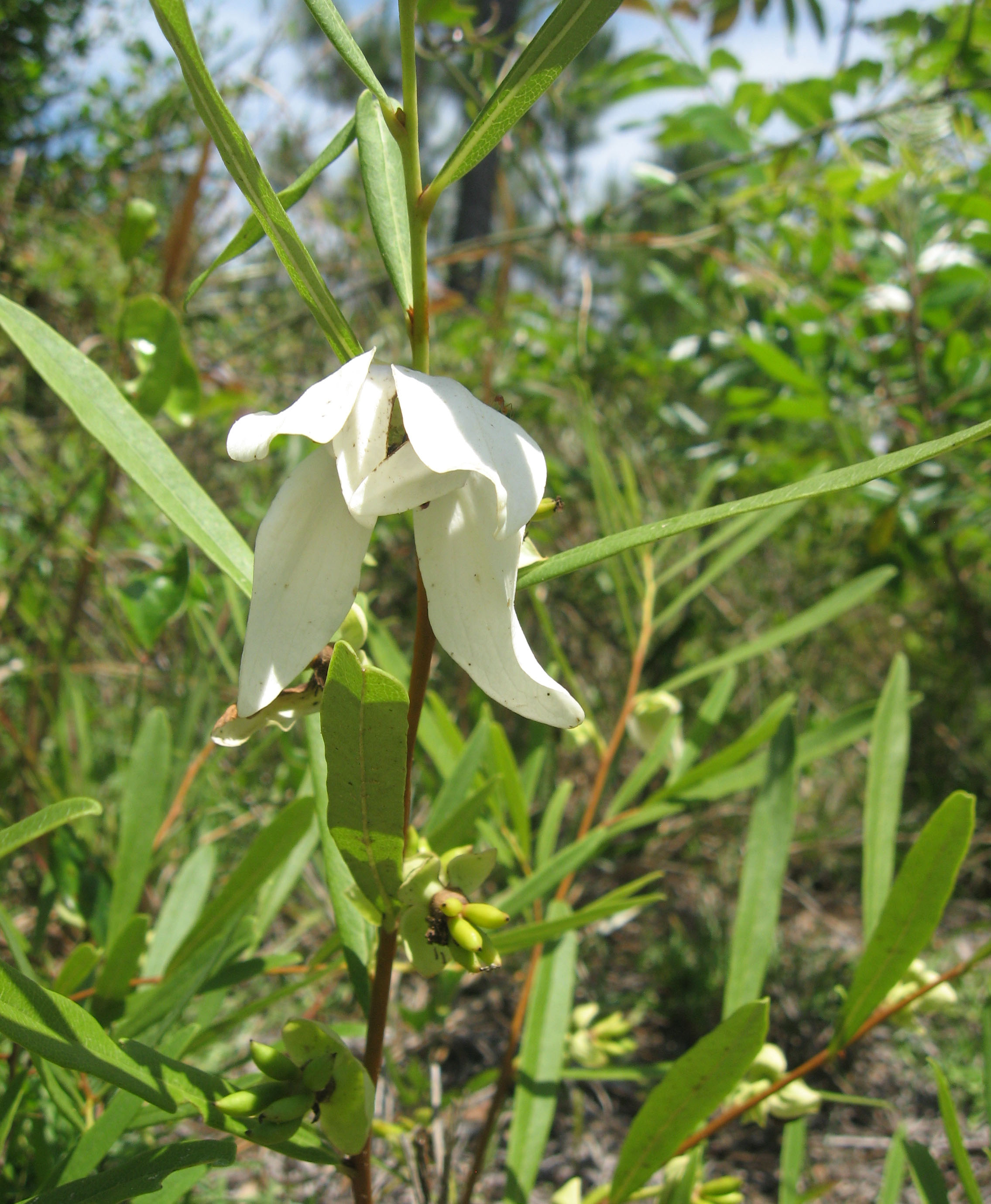

Conservation status
- Apparently Secure (NatureServe)

Scientific classification
- Kingdom: Plantae
- Clade: Tracheophytes
- Clade: Angiosperms
- Clade: Magnoliids
- Order: Magnoliales
- Family: Annonaceae
- Genus: Asimina
- Species: A. longifolia

Binomial name
- Asimina longifolia Kral

Synonyms
- Asimina angustifolia A.Gray; Pityothamnus angustifolius (A. Gray) Small

= Asimina longifolia =

Species of flowering plant

Asimina longifolia, the slim-leaf pawpaw or polecat-bush, is a shrub in the custard apple family. It is native to the Southeastern United States where it is found on the coastal plain.

There are two named varieties:

- A. longifolia var. longifolia - Only found in Florida and Georgia.
- A. longifolia var. spatulata - Found from southern Alabama to southern South Carolina.

It is unclear if the two varieties should be considered distinct species. This group is in need of further taxonomic study.

== Description ==
It is a small bush 2 to 3 feet in height. Prominent features include long narrow leaves, 4 by 1/4 inches, and white flowers. Its pollen is shed in permanent tetrads.

== Ecology ==
=== Habitat ===
A. lognifolia's preferred habitat is dry pinelands or dry maritime forests. It has been observed to grow in association with Florida phlox, queen's delight, laurel oak, and coastal blackroot, among others.

=== Phenology ===
This species has been observed to flower from spring into the summer.

=== Fire Ecology ===
A. longifolia has been observed in areas both fire excluded and burned.
