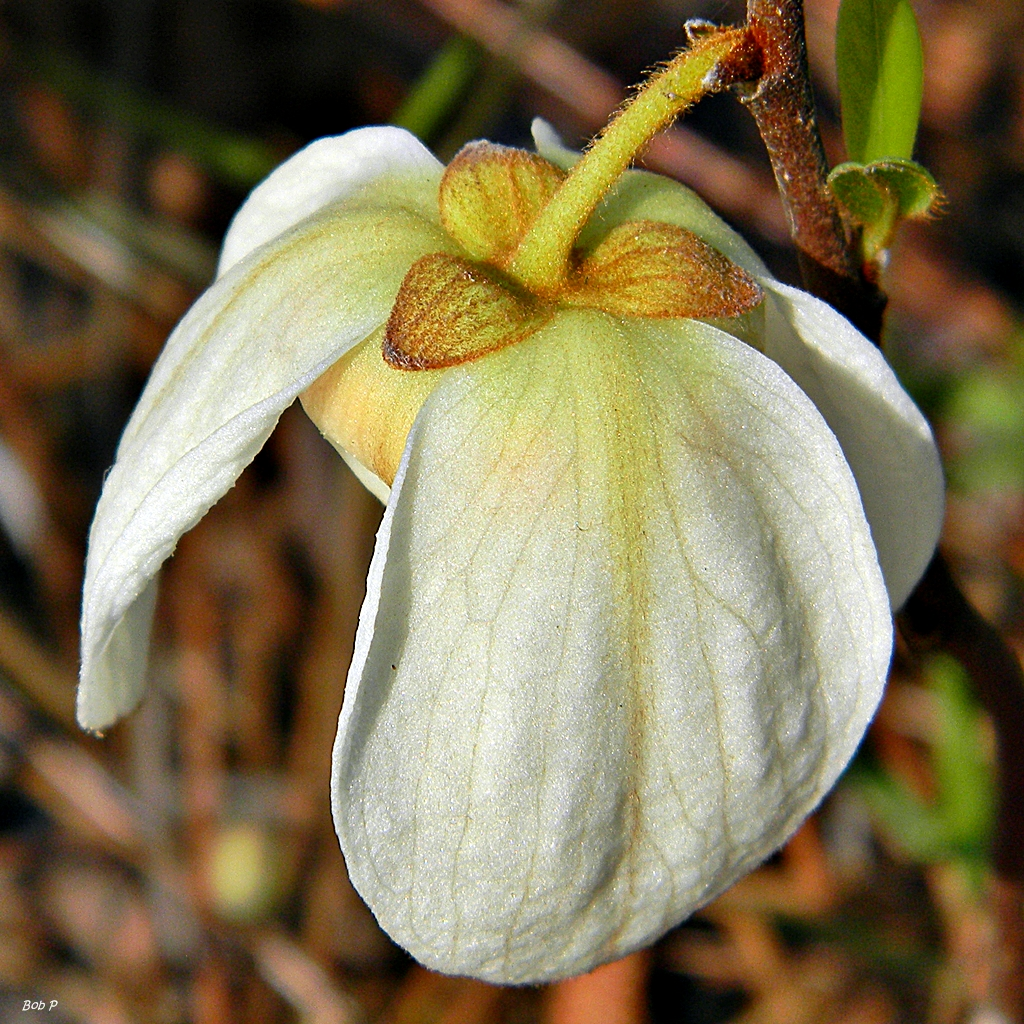
- Photograph of Asimina reticulata

Conservation status
- Apparently Secure (NatureServe)

Scientific classification
- Kingdom: Plantae
- Clade: Tracheophytes
- Clade: Angiosperms
- Clade: Magnoliids
- Order: Magnoliales
- Family: Annonaceae
- Genus: Asimina
- Species: A. reticulata

Binomial name
- Asimina reticulata Shuttlew. ex Chapm.

Synonyms
- Pityothamnus reticulatus (Shuttlew. ex Chapm.) Small

= Asimina reticulata =

Species of plant

Asimina reticulata, the netted pawpaw, is a species of plant in the family Annonaceae. It is endemic to Florida in the United States.

== Description ==
It is a bush reaching 1.5 meters in height. It has a deep, spindle-shaped taproot from which 1 to several shoots emerge. The shoot bark changes color with age beginning as tan or rust-colored, transitioning to brown or gray-brown and becoming gray. Its leathery, oblong leaves are 5-8 centimeters long with tips that are pointed, rounded or slightly notched. The margin of the leaves are rolled under. The young leaves have sparse orange hairs on their upper surfaces and dense orange hair and their lower surfaces. The mature leaves are hairless and pale green on their upper surface and much paler and sparsely hairy on their lower surface. Its petioles are 2-6 millimeters long. It has 1-3 flowers per node on 2-3.5 centimeter long pedicels that emerge from the axils of leaf scars. The Pedicels are covered in orange hairs. Its flowers are fragrant and have a nodding habit. Its flowers have 3 (sometimes 4) triangular sepals that are 8-10 millimeters long. The sepals have red hairs on their outer surface and are hairless on their inner surface. Its flowers have 6 petals in two rows of 3. The oval, white, outer petals are 3-7 centimeters long with wavy margins. The outer petals have orange hairs on their outer surfaces and are hairless on their inner surfaces. The fleshy inner petals are 1-3.5 centimeters, shaped like narrow triangles, rolled back on their outer surface, and have swollen bases deeply wrinkled and purple on their inner surface. The stamens form a pale green or pink androecium 0.5 centimeters in diameter. Its flowers have 3-8 spindle-shaped carpels that are covered in orange hairs. Its irregularly-shaped, yellow-green, hairless fruit are 4-7 centimeters long. Its brown, shiny seeds are 1-2 centimeters long and arranged in two irregular rows.

=== Reproductive biology ===
The pollen of Asimina reticulata is shed as permanent tetrads. It is pollinated by the dark flower scarab beetle Euphoria sepulcralis and the hairy flower scarab beetle Trichiotinus rufobrunneus.

=== Habitat and distribution ===
It has been observed growing in moist, poorly drained sand in piney flatwoods and coastal dune scrub habitats.
