= Jesuit Forum for Social Faith and Justice =

Canadian social justice center

Coordinates: 43.667222°N 79.390021°W

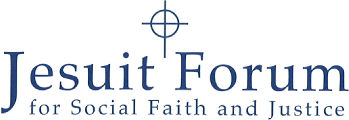
- Abbreviation: Jesuit Forum
- Formation: 1979
- Founder: Society of Jesus
- Location(s): 70 Saint Mary Street; Toronto, Ontario, Canada
- Main organ: Open Space
- Website: JesuitForum.ca
- Formerly called: Jesuit Centre for Social Faith and Justice

Jesuit Forum for Social Faith and Justice, abbreviated to the Jesuit Forum and formerly known as the Jesuit Centre for Social Faith and Justice, is a centre for social justice located in Toronto, Ontario, Canada. It is a place where people and groups meet for discourse and engagement in social justice. It was founded by the Society of Jesus in 1979. It worked with Jamie Swift in researching and publishing about social analysis in Canada. It is situated in Loretto College, part of St. Michael's College in the University of Toronto.

== History ==
It was created in 1979 by Cardinal Michael Czerny, S.J., and Fr. Jim Webb, S.J., to promote methodologies for social justice analysis. It was composed of four sections that worked on issues to do with Latin America, Jesuit Refugee Service, ecology at the Ignatius Jesuit Centre and Canada. In 1988, Jamie Swift, with Fr. Michael Czerny, S.J., wrote Getting Started on Social Analysis in Canada. By 2003, a fourth edition of the book had been printed. In the 1986, the centre started The Moment Project. It was a group of over one hundred community activists from across Canada who met to discuss methodologies for social and political analysis. In 1989, they published Naming the Moment: Political Analysis for Action, A Manual for Community Groups. It sold out and was reprinted in 1991.

In 1996, it ceased most of its operations, because of a lack of funding. Some work continued, but only in three areas: Jesuit Refugee Service, ecological projects at the Ignatius Jesuit Centre and Catholic social teaching. In 1997, the Centre for Social Justice was created separately to carry on the work of the Jesuit Centre. In 2001, the organisation returned, under the new name Jesuit Forum for Social Faith and Justice.

== See also ==
- List of Jesuit sites
- Centre for Justice and Faith
