= Loyola House =

Coordinates: 43.572251°N 80.287032°W

- Loyola House Retreat and Training Centre
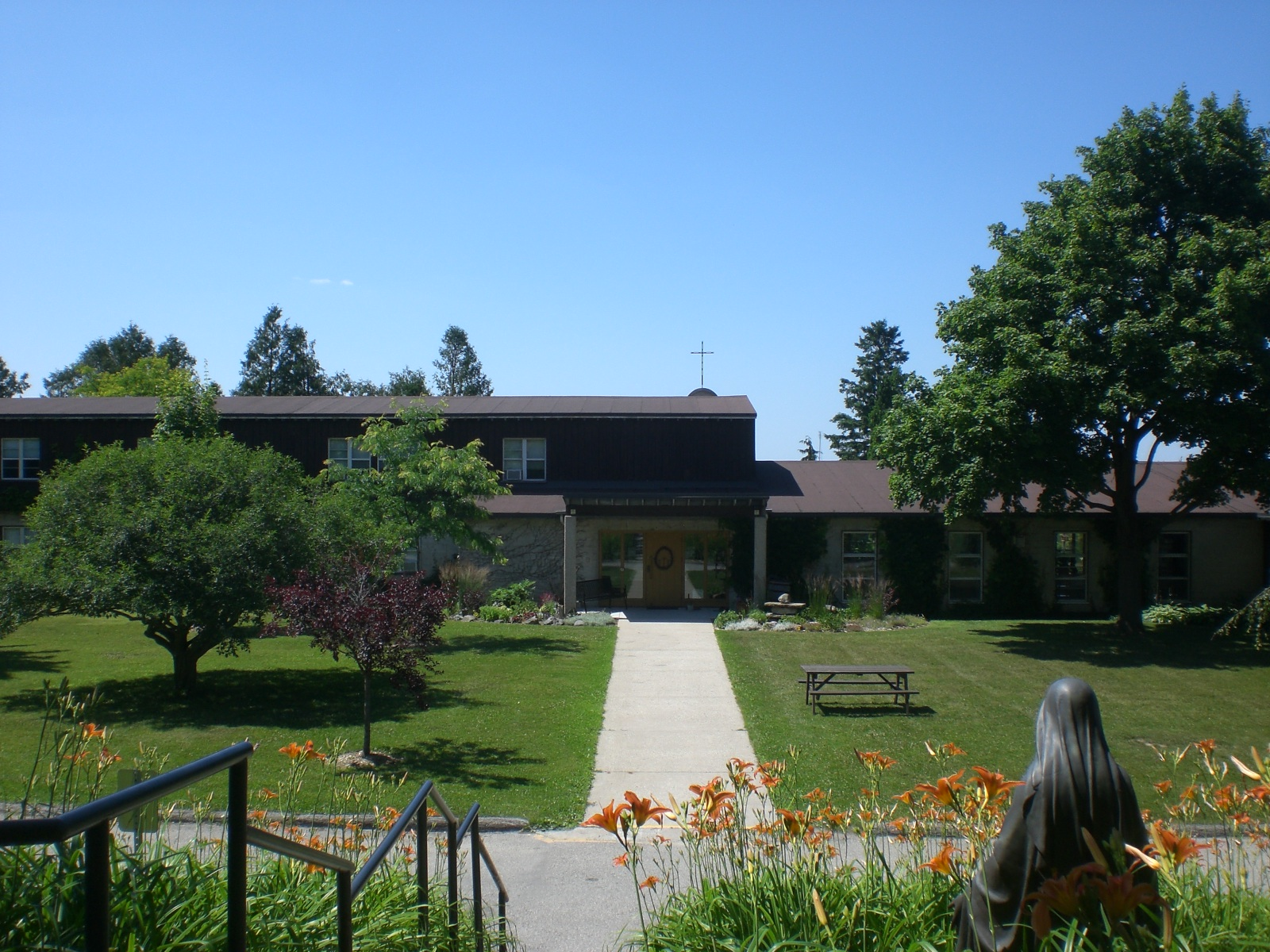
- Entrance to the centre

- Location in Southern Ontario
- Location: Ignatius Jesuit Centre, Guelph
- Country: Canada
- Denomination: Roman Catholic
- Website: LoyolaHouse.com

History
- Status: Active
- Founded: 1964
- Founder: Society of Jesus
- Dedication: Loyola

Architecture
- Functional status: Retreat centre

Administration
- Province: Toronto
- Diocese: Hamilton
- Deanery: Wellington
- Parish: Holy Rosary

Loyola House or its full name Loyola House Retreat and Training Centre is a Jesuit spirituality centre in Guelph, Ontario. It moved to Guelph in 1964 and was the centre of a renewal in Ignatian spirituality in the 1970s. It is within the grounds of the Ignatius Jesuit Centre situated on Woolwich Street to the west of Riverside Park. In the 1960s and 1970s it was the centre of a significant shift in Ignatian spirituality.

== History ==
Originally, the centre was situated in Oakville. In 1962, the decision was made by the Society of Jesus to sell the site and move the centre to Guelph. The old site in Oakville became the Glen Abbey Golf Course. From 1962 construction began on the spirituality centre in Guelph, helped by financial assistance from Bishop Joseph Ryan of Hamilton. In 1964, it was opened and was called the Guelph Centre of Spirituality. At first, it only hosted weekend retreats for parishioners from churches within the Diocese of Hamilton.

From the late 1960s to the 1970s it became the centre of a change in how retreats in Ignatian spirituality were conducted and changed its name to Loyola House. Two Jesuit priests, John English, S.J. and John Veltri, S.J. altered the experience for those on retreat. They came from St Beuno's College in Wales with new ideas about Ignatian spirituality. Before this time, retreats were preached; at certain times in the day, those on retreat would all be told what to pray. Veltri and English changed this by providing points for prayer through daily interviews with the retreatants, giving personal one-to-one spiritual direction. Veltri was at Loyola House from 1967, and English was the novice master at the St. Stanislaus Novitiate next door in 1965, moving over to Loyola House in 1978.

In 2020, it became a shelter for homeless people during the COVID-19 pandemic.

== Overview ==
It continues to offers retreats in Ignatian spirituality within a 240-acre setting close to the Guelph Lake Conservation Area.

== Exterior and grounds ==
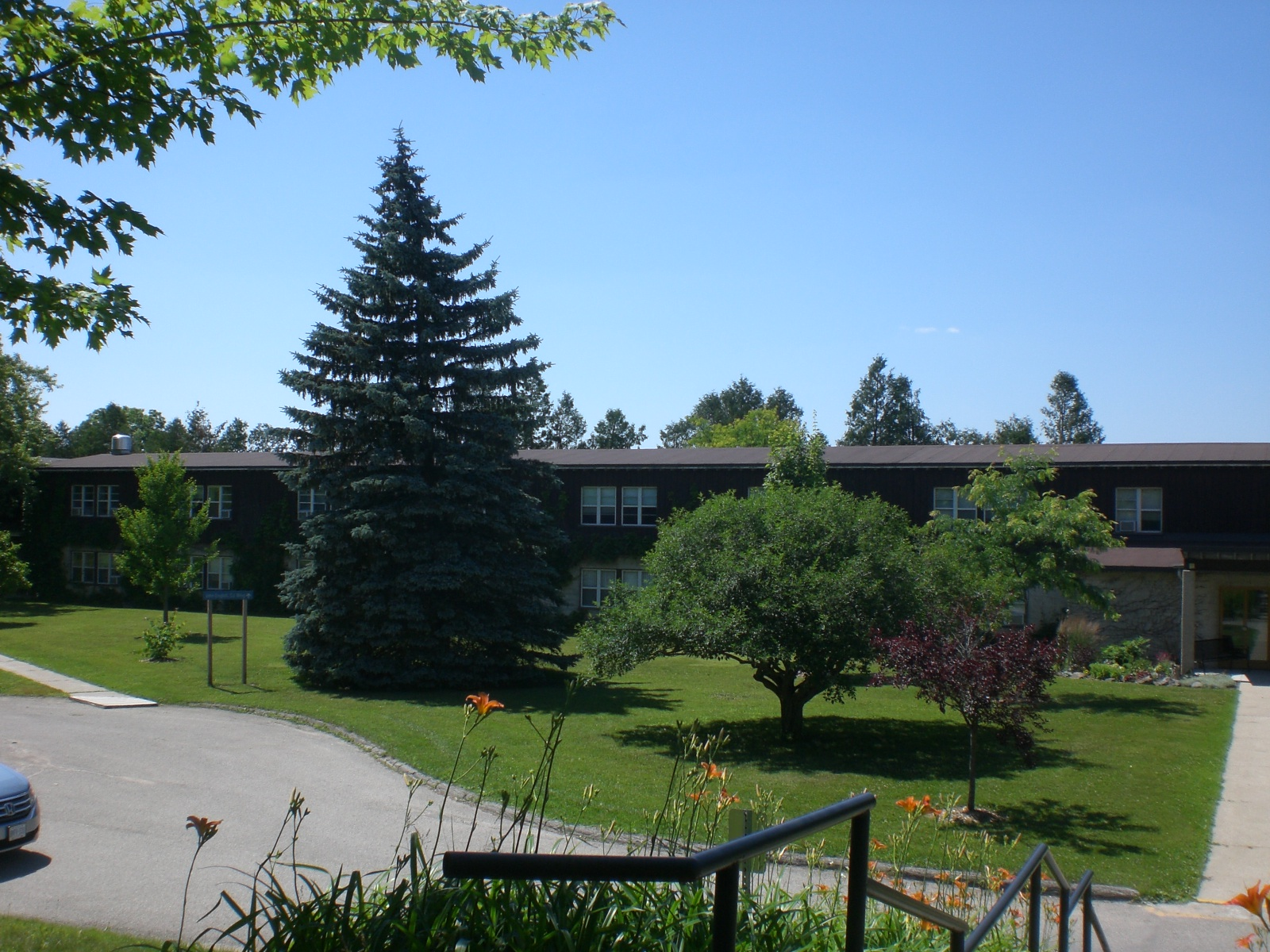
A wing of the centre

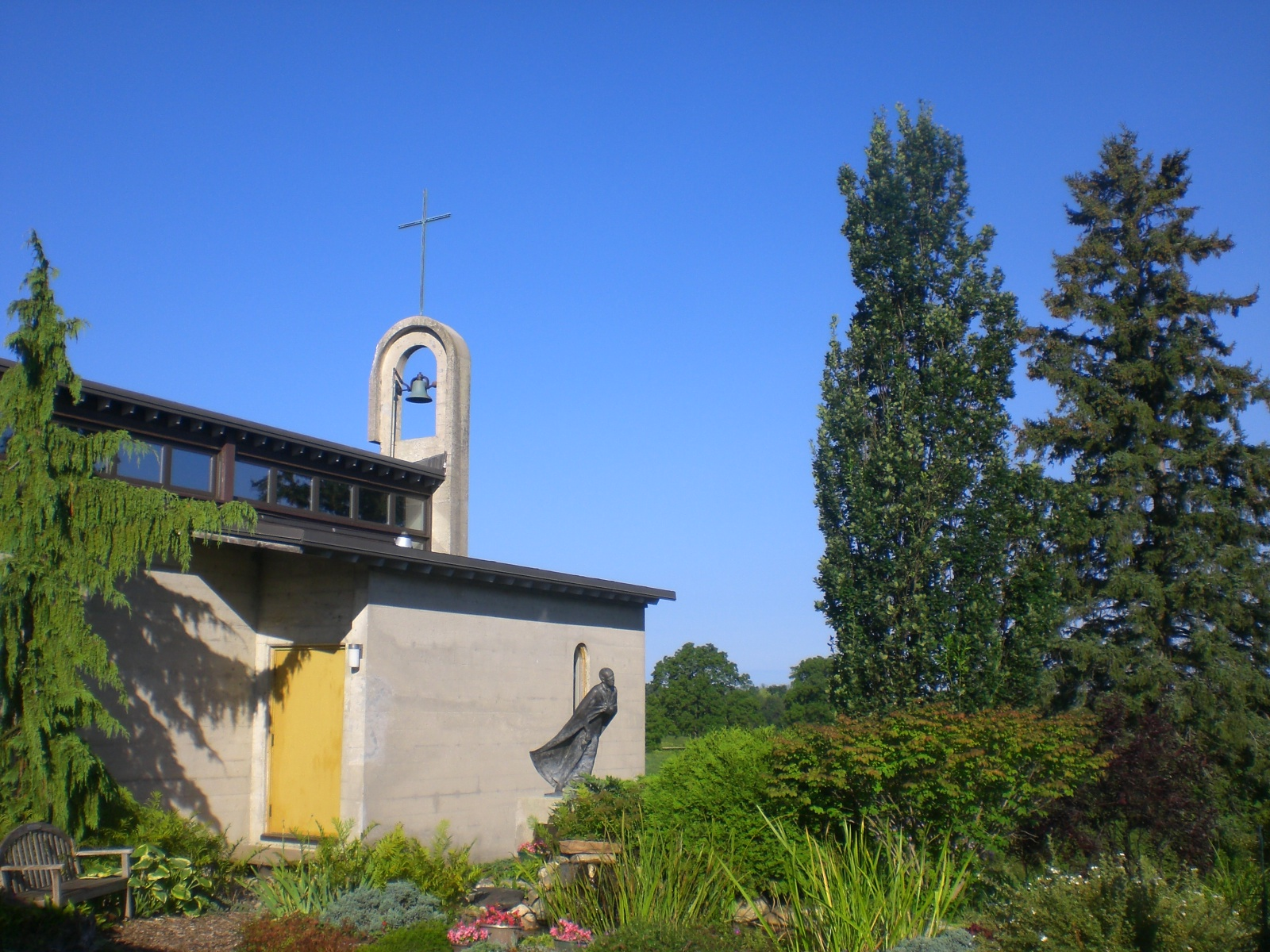
Chapel and statue of Saint Ignatius

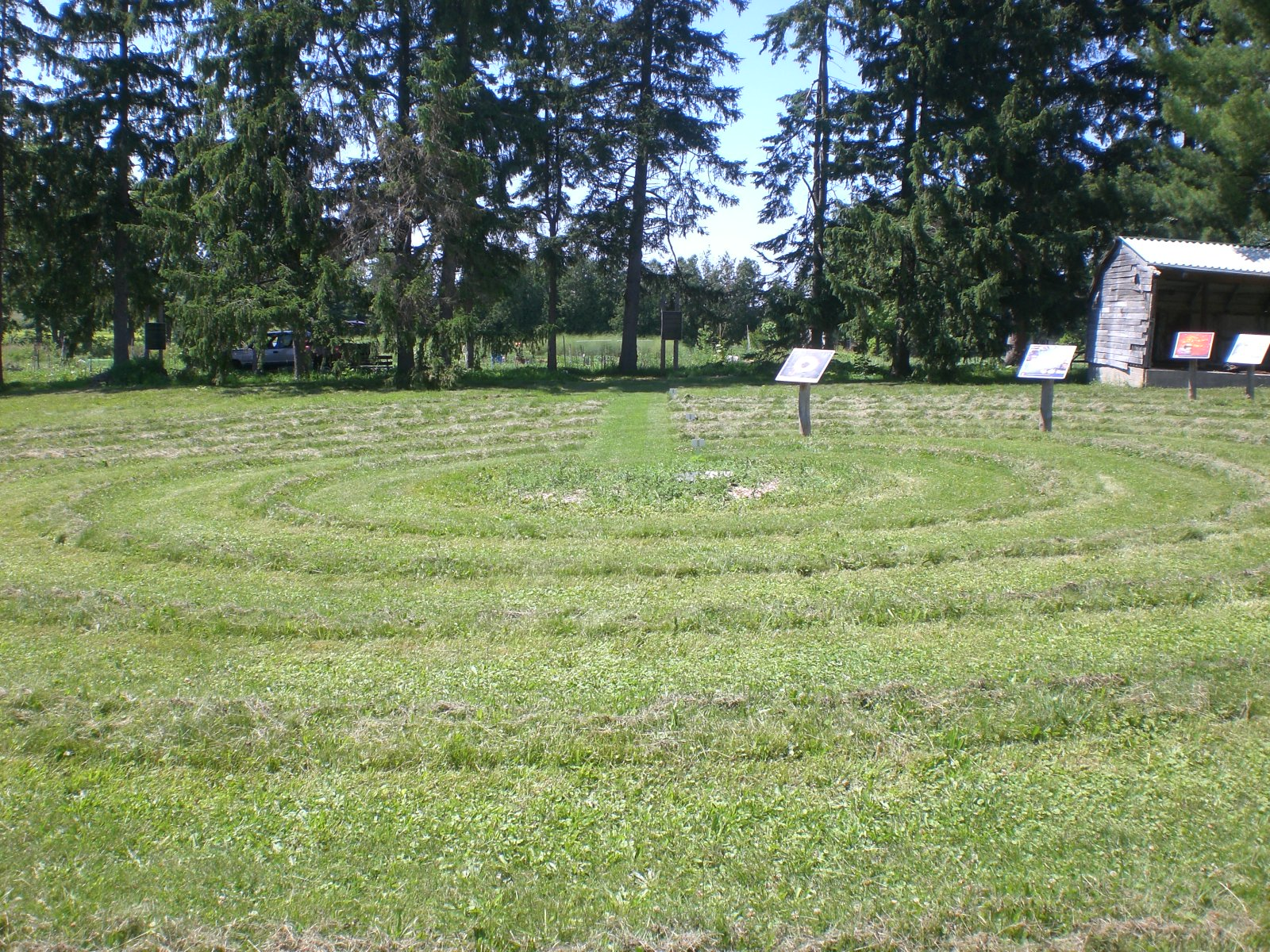
Labyrinth within the grounds

== See also ==
- Ignatian spirituality
- Ignatius Jesuit Centre
- List of Jesuit sites
