= CJF =

CJF may refer to

- Canadian Journalism Foundation
- Center for the Jewish Future
- Centre for Justice and Faith
- Charles James Fox
- Coondewanna Airport, IATA airport code "CJF"
