= Guelph Raid =

Canadian World War One raid related to conscription

Coordinates: 43.5702°N 80.2835°W

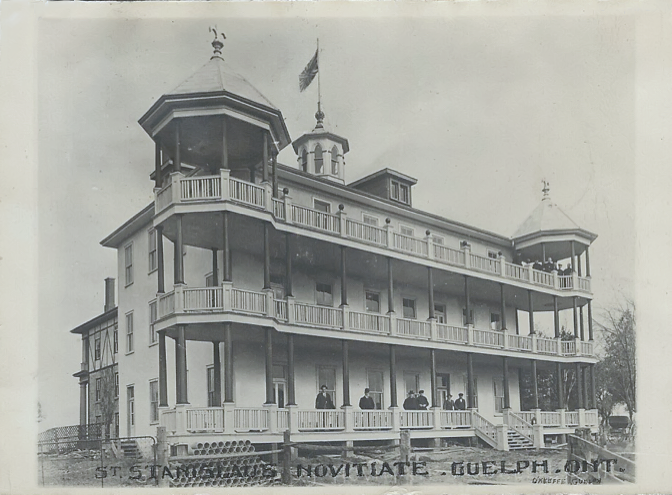
- St. Stanislaus novitiate, about 1920
- Date: June 7, 1918
- Location: St. Stanislaus Novitiate, Guelph, Ontario
- Also known as: Guelph Novitiate Raid
- Theme: Conscription Crisis of 1917
- Participants: Society of Jesus; Charles Doherty; Department of Militia and Defence
- Inquiries: Royal Commission in April 1919
- Verdict: No foundation for charges; Exemption of Jesuit novices from the Military Service Act

The Guelph Raid was an incident that occurred at the St. Stanislaus Novitiate in Guelph, Ontario, in 1918. The novitiate was attended by the son of Charles Doherty, the Justice Minister of Canada. Canadian military officers surrounded it attempting to enforce the Military Service Act, causing a royal commission to be appointed by the Parliament of Canada in April 1919.

== Background ==
The Military Service Act was passed in 1917 to increase the men enlisted to replace the casualties in World War I. When it was enforced in on 1 January 1918, riots broke out in Quebec in protest at the act. By April 1918, the government had amended the act so that most of the exemptions had been removed, such as those working on farms, except "clergy, including members of any recognised order of an exclusively religious character, and ministers of all religious denominations existing in Canada at the date of the passing of this Act."

However, the question on when a clerical student becomes clergy was an issue. Catholic seminarians became members of the clergy at the start of their training. Protestant students for the priesthood became clergy or ministers at the end of their training. Charles Doherty, the Minister of Justice, felt that the act exempted Catholic students for the priesthood. However, in late May 1918, enforcement of the act no longer became the responsibility of the police under the Ministry of Justice but that of the military police, which came under the Department of Militia and Defence. Many, such as General S. C. Mewburn, Minister of the Militia and Defence, Henry Westoby, the military representative in Guelph, and Colonel Godson-Godson, provost marshal for Canada, were not aware of the Minister of Justice's previous interpretation or did not agree with it.

== Royal commission ==
In 1919, Robert Borden organized a royal commission into the raid, and attempted to name Chief Justice of Canada Louis Henry Davies and Puisne Justice Francis Alexander Anglin to the commission. Both justices declined the appointment, with Davies noting it would be "undesirable the Chief Justice of Canada should be mixed up with [such a political and religious controversy]."

== Timeline ==
- 30 May 1918: Colonel Godson-Godson, provost marshal for Canada, telegraphed military representatives in London, Ontario, and asked why students at the Guelph novitiate had not been "called."
- 5 June 1918: General Mewburn sent a memo to London, Ontario, asking why the novitiate had not been "cleaned out." Major J. Hirsch then asked Captain A. C. Macauley to organize a squad to search the novitiate for evaders.
- 9:30 pm on 7 June 1918: A squad, led by Captain Macauley, all dressed in civilian clothes, surrounded the Jesuit Novitiate in Guelph. Macauley and Inspector Menard went into the novitiate and met the rector, a Jesuit priest named Bourque, who was ordered to present all the novices within 5 minutes. He sought advice from William Hingston, a Jesuit priest and army chaplain with the rank of captain, to meet Macauley and Menard. Hingston came in full military dress and requested to see Macauley's documentation. Macauley provided a document that said that he needed authorization, but refused to show the authorization itself. Three Jesuit novices were arrested, including Marcus Doherty, the son of Charles Doherty, the Minister of Justice.
- Midnight on 7 June 1918: After interrogation, Marcus Doherty phoned his father. Macauley then spoke with the Minister of Justice, who told Macauley that he was acting illegally and should withdraw from the novitiate and explain his actions in a report. He also requested that no information be given to the press.
- 8 June 1918, Macauley returned to the novitiate to obtain a complete list of information.
- 19 June 1918: The Toronto Star broke the story and triggered other newspapers to report on the incident for the next three months. Macauley was transferred to Winnipeg. The Jesuits transferred Bourque to be rector of St. Paul's College, Manitoba.
- 16 August 1918, The Guelph Daily Herald wrote about sermons by M. B. Christie and Kennedy Palmer of the Guelph Ministerial Association who "exhorted the Orangemen to stand firm against the menace of the Roman Catholic Church" and that it appeared that the Church "had its hand at the throat of the new government."
- Early September 1918: Kennedy Palmer went on a tour of Western Canada to speak about his views on what happened in Guelph.
- 7 April 1919: Motion in Parliament requesting a royal commission on the events in Guelph to investigate charges brought by Palmer against Doherty and the Department of Justice of improper conduct and interference in the application of the Military Service Act to the Jesuit novitiate and imposing censor on the news of the affair.
- 9 September 1919: First of five days of testimony taken by the royal commission on the affair.
- 3 November 1919: Royal commission report published. It stated that there were 'no foundation' for any charge against Charles Doherty, the Minister of Justice, and the Department of Justice. Also, it stated that all of the Jesuit novices were exempt from the Military Service Act. It went on to say that Macauley made three errors. He did not produce any written authority at the novitiate, he conducted the raid in civilian clothes, and he was highhanded in his manner throughout the evening.

== See also ==
- Society of Jesus
- Ignatius Jesuit Centre
