= Conscription in Canada =

Compulsory military service in Canada

Compulsory service in a sedentary militia was practised in Canada as early as 1669 and continued until the late 19th century, when Canada's sedentary Reserve Militia fell into disuse. However, conscription into a full-time military service had only been instituted twice by the government of Canada, during both world wars.

Conscription into any armed service has not been practised in Canada since the end of the Second World War in 1945.

== Compulsory service in the sedentary militia ==
Compulsory enrolment in New France's militia system was made mandatory in 1669. Most colonies in British America continued to maintain compulsory sedentary militia systems after the conquest of New France in 1760.

Compulsory enrolment in the sedentary militia system remained in place after Canadian Confederation in 1867, although the sedentary militia system fell into disuse by the late 19th century.

=== New France ===
Service in the militia of New France was mandatory from 1669, with all valid male inhabitants aged 16 to 60 being required to enrol. The militia was levied in times of conflict and was required to take up arms.

Colonial authorities provided militia members with only limited equipment, including a shirt, hood, breechcloth, leggings, moccasins, and a blanket. Militia members were expected to arm themselves and have their own supply of ammunition and gunpowder. A quartermaster would provide firearms for those who needed one, although militiamen were expected to return the weapon after each expedition.

Each parish in the New French colony of Canada had a militia company led by a captain appointed by the governor of New France. Each company belonged to one of three militia districts, Quebec, Montreal, and Trois-Rivières.

=== British North America and Canada ===
Militias were also levied in most British North American colonies. Following the British conquest of New France, the local Canadian militia system largely remained intact, with former New French officers receiving new military commissions from the British to continue their militia duties. The first real change to the former New French system was introduced in 1777, when the Province of Quebec enacted its first militia legislation, drawing upon former New French customs and legislation passed in Nova Scotia in 1758. The British levied the Quebec militias to assist in campaigning during Pontiac's War and for defence during the American Revolutionary War.

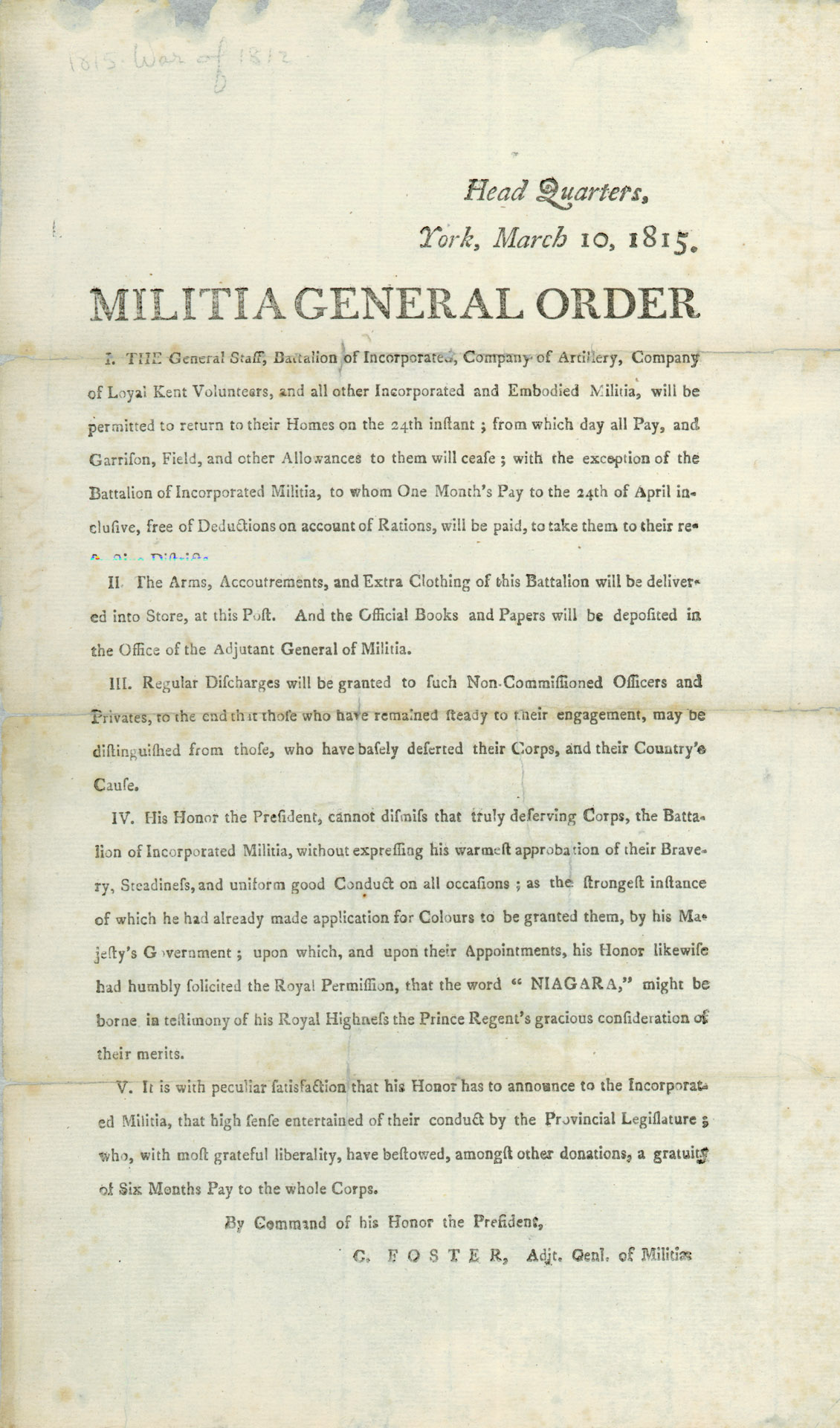
A militia general order from the Adjutant General of Militias in Upper Canada to demobilize after the War of 1812, March 1815.

Compulsory militia service was continued after Quebec was split into the Canadas, with Upper Canada naming male inhabitants aged 16 to 50 as members of the militia in 1793. Later provisions passed the next year raised the age to 60. Compulsory service for males aged 16 to 60 was formalized in legislation in Lower Canada in 1803 and in Upper Canada in 1808. In peacetime, compulsory service in the Canadas was typically limited to attending a one to two-day annual muster, although they may be liable for further service during wartime. In addition to the Canadas, sedentary militias were also maintained in the Maritime colonies.

The colonies of British Columbia and Vancouver Island were one of the few colonies in British North America that did not maintain a militia and did not require its inhabitants to sign up for a militia roll.

==== Decline of the compulsory sedentary militia system ====
The Militia Act of 1855, reorganized the militia system of the Province of Canada into two classes, the volunteer Active Militia and the compulsory sedentary militia (later called the Reserve Militia). In 1862, proposed legislation to enhance the sedentary militia ignited a debate over whether Canada should rely on its compulsory or voluntary service for its defence. Following the 1863 general election, a new Militia Act was passed, shifting the burden of defence to the Active Militia, although it also preserved the sedentary militia.

The Militia Act, 1868 extended the sedentary militia system of the former Province of Canada to the newly formed Canadian dominion. In 1869, the Minister of Militia and Defence, George-Étienne Cartier, reported that 618,896 men were enrolled with the sedentary militia or "Reserve Militia". However, as Canada's military development was focused on the volunteer Active Militia, the sedentary militia system fell into disuse in the 1870s and 1880s.

The formal requirement to hold an annual muster for the sedentary militia was stricken from legislation in 1883, having been rarely held by that time. In 1904, the legislative provision that formally made every male inhabitant of military age a member of the Reserve Militia was removed, instead replacing it with a provision that theoretically makes them "liable to serve in the militia". Although the Reserve Militia was an unorganized service and virtually non-existent by the early 20th century, an officers' roll for the sedentary service was maintained as late as 1921.

== Compulsory full-time military service ==
Compulsory service of individuals in a full-time military service was enforced in Canada during both world wars. In the First World War, conscription into the Canadian Expeditionary Force began in the war's final year, in January 1918. During the Second World War, conscription into the Canadian military for home defence service was enacted in 1940, and for overseas service in 1944.

=== First World War ===
On 18 May 1917, Prime Minister Robert Borden made a speech to Parliament in support of compulsory service in the Canadian Expeditionary Force, due to the losses they had sustained. The Military Service Act, 1917 was passed in Parliament on 29 August. Support for the bill split between linguistic lines, with nearly all French-speaking members of Parliament opposing conscription and nearly all English-speaking members supporting it.

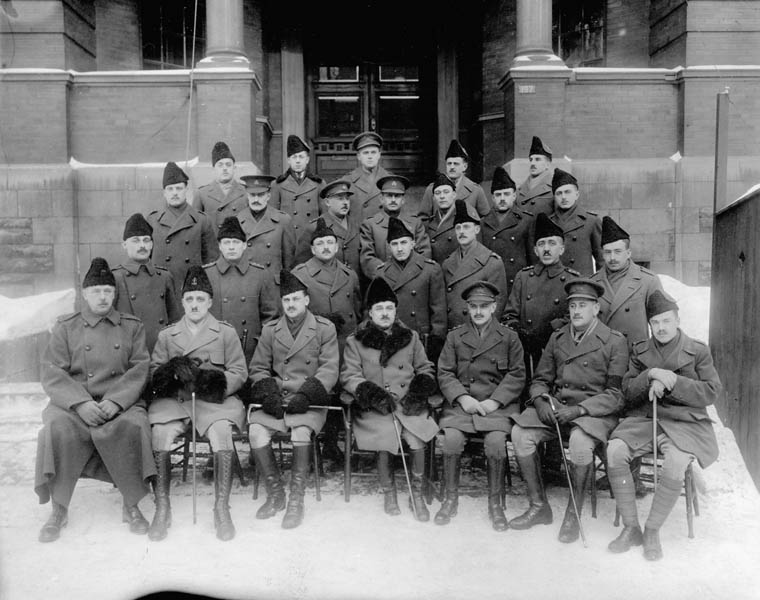
French Canadian officers of the first French Canadian Battalion to be formed under conscription, 1918.

The Act became a major issue in the 1917 Canadian federal election, with English Canada broadly in support of conscription while French Canada and agricultural workers in the west largely opposed it. The conscription issue was largely responsible for the re-election of Borden's government. Call-ups for military service into the Canadian Expeditionary Force began in January 1918. Opposition to conscription in Quebec resulted in a riot breaking out in between 28 March and 1 April 1918.

The Act made all male citizens aged 20 to 45 subject to call-up for military service, through the end of the war. Status Indians and Métis men were initially considered eligible for a call-up, although they were declared exempt from the Act in January after First Nations leaders challenged the Act on grounds it violated Indigenous treaties with The Crown. Of the 401,882 men who registered for conscription, 124,588 men were drafted for service. Of those, 99,651 were deemed fit for service, with 47,509 conscripts being sent overseas and the remainder serving in Canada.

=== Second World War ===
Shortly after the outbreak of the Second World War, the federal government pledged to not conscript soldiers for overseas service. However, after the Fall of France, the government passed the National Resources Mobilization Act, 1940, putting in place the mechanism for compulsory enlistment into Canada's military for home defence purposes in November 1940. Registration for call-up for home defence service took place almost without incident, barring the public opposition of Montreal mayor Camilien Houde.

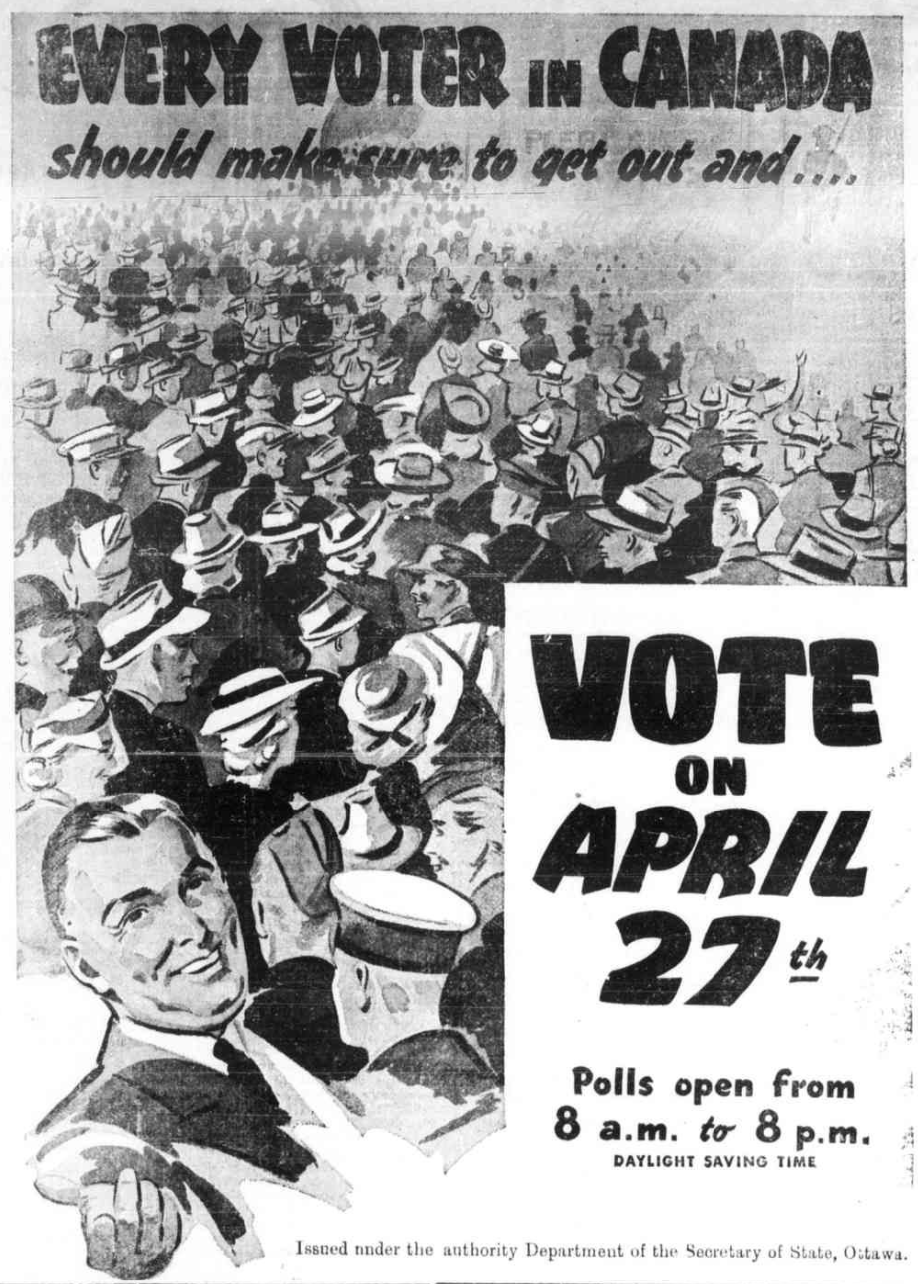
An advertisement to encourage voting on the 1942 Canadian conscription plebiscite.

In 1941, support for conscription progressed, resulting in Prime Minister William Lyon Mackenzie King holding a non-binding plebiscite to release the government from the anti-conscription promise it made at the beginning of the war. The 1942 Canadian conscription plebiscite saw all provinces vote for conscription by some 80 per cent, except Quebec, whose residents voted against conscription by 72.9 per cent. Following the plebiscite, the government passed Bill 80, authorizing conscription for overseas service if it was deemed necessary. The issue remained unpopular in Quebec, with an anti-conscription Bloc populaire party forming in the province during the 1944 Quebec general election.

After the Normandy landings in 1944, Minister of National Defence James Ralston was convinced of the need for overseas conscription. King, who had hoped not to invoke Bill 80, replaced Ralston with anti-conscriptionist General Andrew McNaughton. However, in November 1944, King announced he would enact Bill 80 after his anglophone pro-Conscriptionist ministers threatened to resign over the matter.

Only 12,908 conscripted soldiers were sent to fight overseas, with only 2,463 reaching the front lines before the end of World War II in Europe.

== Post-Second World War ==
Conscription has not been practised in Canada since the end of the Second World War in 1945. The reinstitution of conscription in the country would likely require a legislative act from the Parliament of Canada and an executive act that would initiate call-ups. After the Canadian Charter of Rights and Freedoms was proclaimed in force in 1982, legal scholars have opined that any future conscription system would have to apply to both sexes, as a male-only conscription system would likely be challenged under Section 15 of the Canadian Charter of Rights and Freedoms.

Although it remains unclear if a Charter challenge against the reinstitution of conscription would be successful, Philippe Lagassé, an academic at the Norman Paterson School of International Affairs, has opined that it would likely be permitted under reasonable limits clause if it was deemed "essential to the security of the country".

=== Refuge for Vietnam War draft evaders ===
Canada saw an influx of American draft evaders take refuge in Canada from 1965 to 1975. Approximately 20,000 American draft evaders sought asylum in Canada after being called up in the Vietnam War draft. American draft evaders of the Vietnam War were later pardoned by US President Jimmy Carter in 1977, several years after the conflict ended, with Proclamation 4483.

== See also ==
- Military history of Canada
