= Ignatius Jesuit Centre =

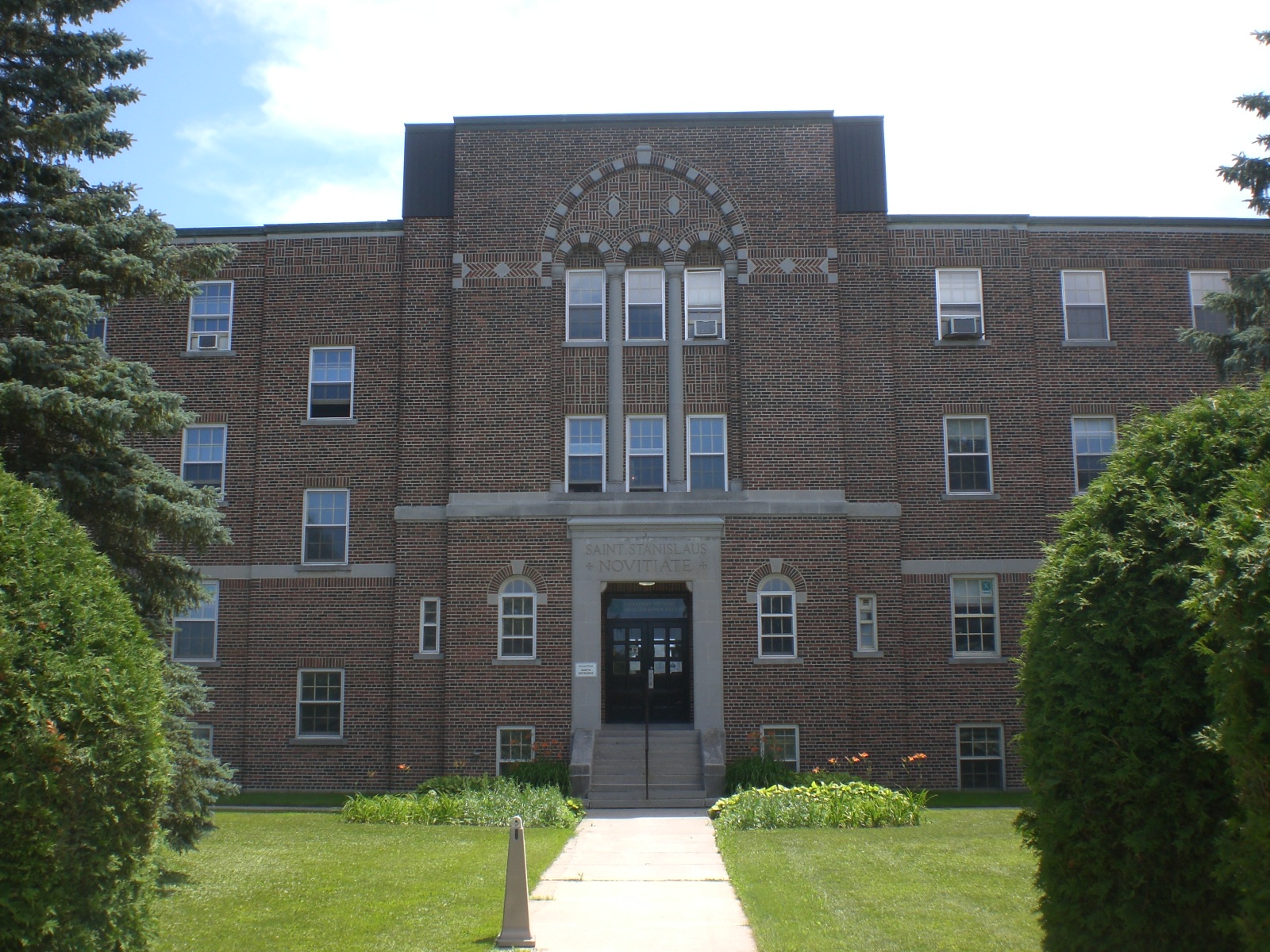
- Orchard Park Office Centre entrance
- Interactive map of the Ignatius Jesuit Centre area
- Former names: Ignatius College; St. Stanislaus Novitiate
- Alternative names: Orchard Park Office Centre

General information
- Architectural style: Federal architecture
- Location: 5420 Hwy 6 North, Guelph, Ontario, Canada
- Coordinates: 43.570543°N 80.284014°W
- Construction started: 1913
- Completed: 1960
- Inaugurated: 1959

Website
- IgnatiusGuelph.ca

Ignatius Jesuit Centre (formerly the St. Stanislaus Novitiate and Ignatius College) is a set of buildings in Guelph, Ontario. It features the Orchard Park Office Centre and the Loyola House Jesuit Retreat and Training Centre. It was founded in 1913 and the current buildings date from 1934. In 1918, St. Stanislaus Novitiate was attended by the son of the Justice Minister of Canada, Charles Doherty, so when Canadian military officers surrounded it attempting to enforce the Military Service Act, the premises became the centre of a political scandal that became known as the Guelph Raid.

== History ==
=== Origin ===
The idea of a Jesuit college in Guelph started in 1852 when the Bishop of Toronto, Armand de Charbonnel invited Fr. John Holzer, S.J. to start a parish in Guelph. In 1857, Fr. Holzer built a rectory, with the intention of it becoming a pre-novitiate. On 7 May 1862, the college opened, but closed less than three years later because of insufficient numbers.

=== Construction ===
In 1913, while the Jesuits were serving the churches in Guelph, such as the Church of Our Lady Immaculate, they built the novitiate in north Guelph. It started when thirteen English-speaking Canadian Jesuits came to Guelph and purchased an old farmhouse, additional land, 240 hectares and renovated the farmhouse. It was for the training of future Jesuits and was called the St. Stanislaus Novitiate.

=== Guelph Raid ===
On 7 June 1918, military officers came and surrounded the building in search of men who may have joined the Jesuits to avoid conscription. This resulted in a scandal, because the son of the Justice Minister of Canada, Charles Doherty was studying to be a Jesuit there at the time. The ensuing dispute revealed the feelings that emerged after the introduction of the Military Service Act. A Royal Commission was created to investigate the incident and discussion in the media subsided when the commission's report was published in November 1919.

=== Expansion ===
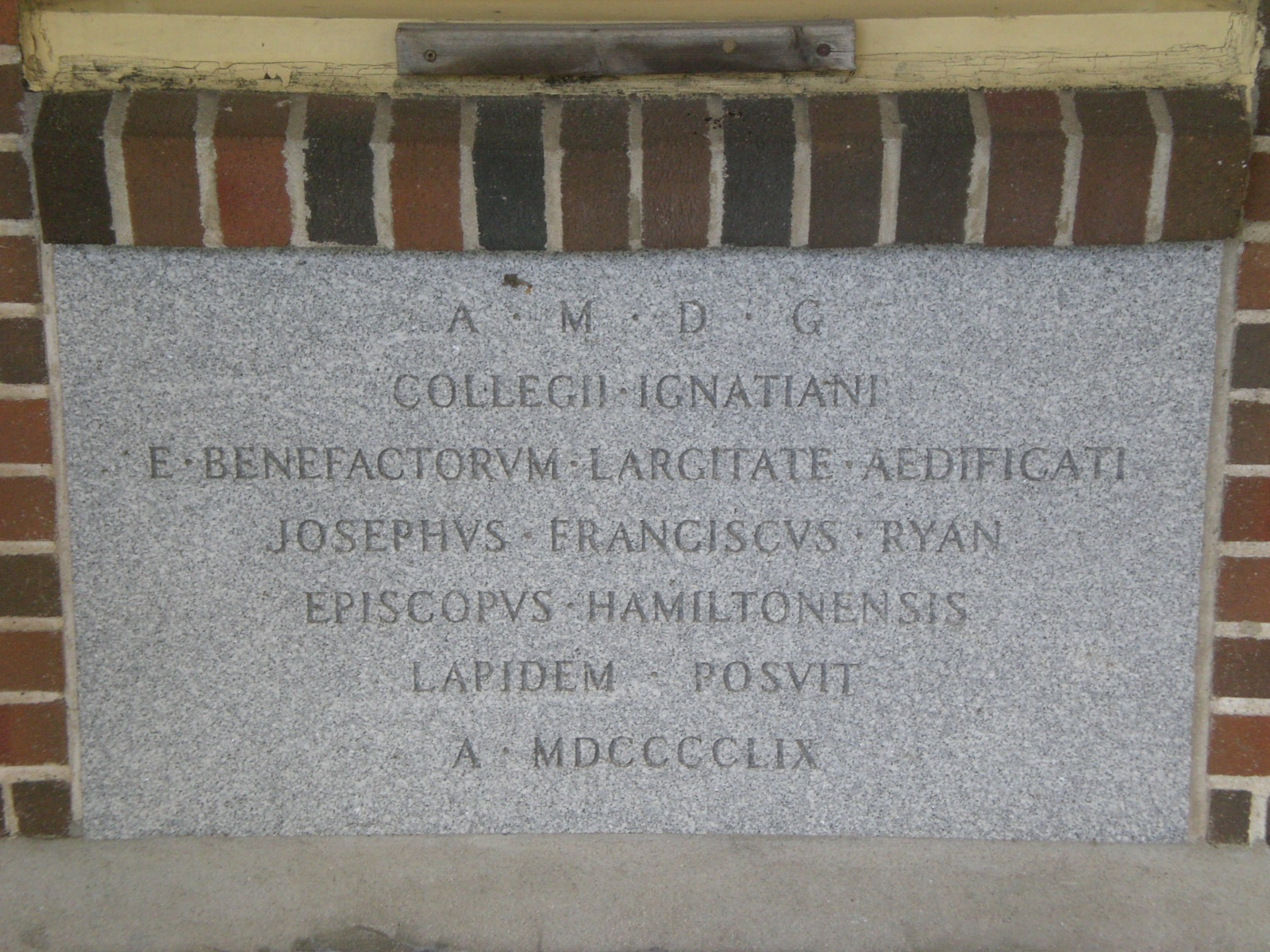
Brick by the chapel entrance marking its opening by the Bishop of Hamilton

In 1921, a wing was added to the building that housed a chapel. In 1934, an expansion was required and a new building was added to the west of the site. It was built to house the juniorate. The juniorate was where Jesuits who had completed the novitiate stage in formation would go on to study Classics before studying philosophy at Regis College in Toronto. It currently serves as offices for Nature Conservancy of Canada and is known as Orchard Park West. In 1949, a Federalist style extension was built on to the juniorate building. It currently houses offices for the Canadian Mental Health Association.

In 1954, the original building on the site, the novitiate, burned down. Following the fire, a series of developments were undertaken so that the property could continue as a novitiate and juniorate. The federalist style building became the novitiate and the building was extended to the south and east to house the juniorate. The new extensions were built from 1958 to 1960. When building commenced, the St. Stanislaus Novitiate was renamed and became Ignatius College. Included in the building was an extension that served as the chapel for the people there. In 1959, the partially completed building was opened by the Bishop of Hamilton, Joseph Francis Ryan.

== Closure ==
In 1967, the Classics ceased to be taught and the students were moved elsewhere. In 1994, it was no longer used as a novitiate and in 1996 it was converted into the Orchard Park Office Centre.

The Jesuits still maintain a presence in the area. In 1964, the Loyola House Retreat and Training Centre relocated to be within the grounds of Ignatius College from its previous site in Oakville, Ontario. In 2000, a number of ecological projects were started, such as beekeeping and organic farming.

== Gallery ==
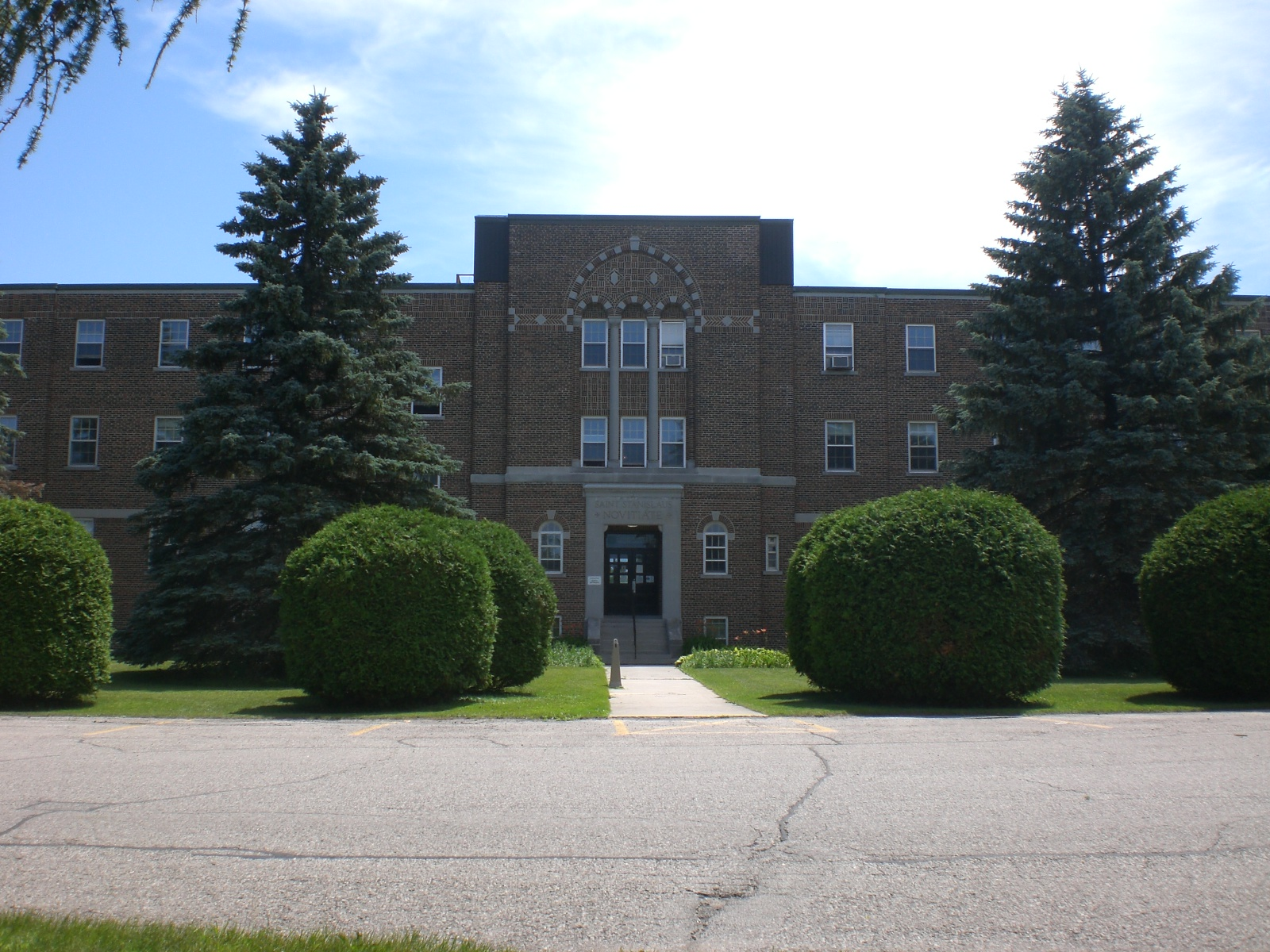
Front of the old novitiate

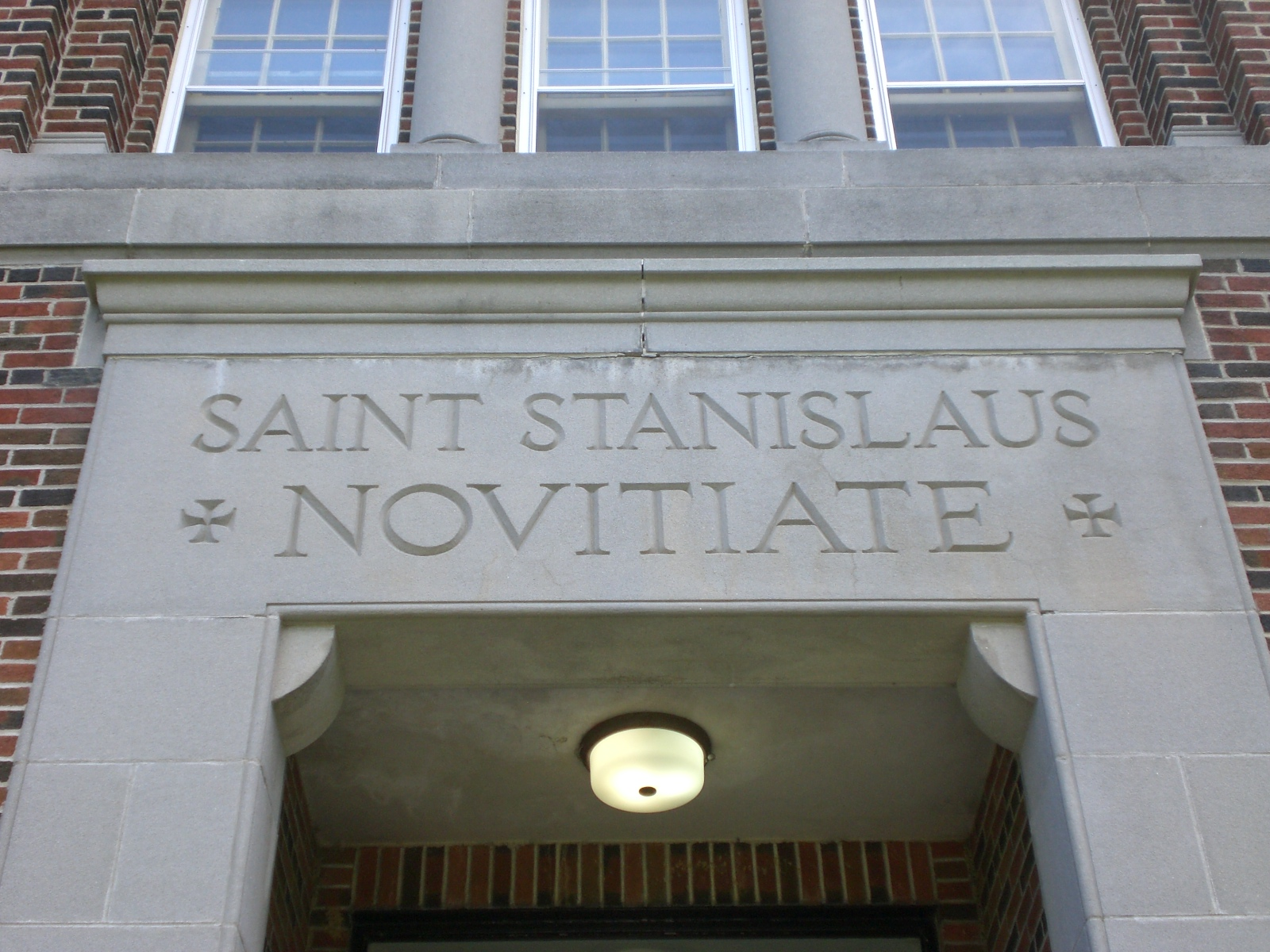
Doorway showing inscription

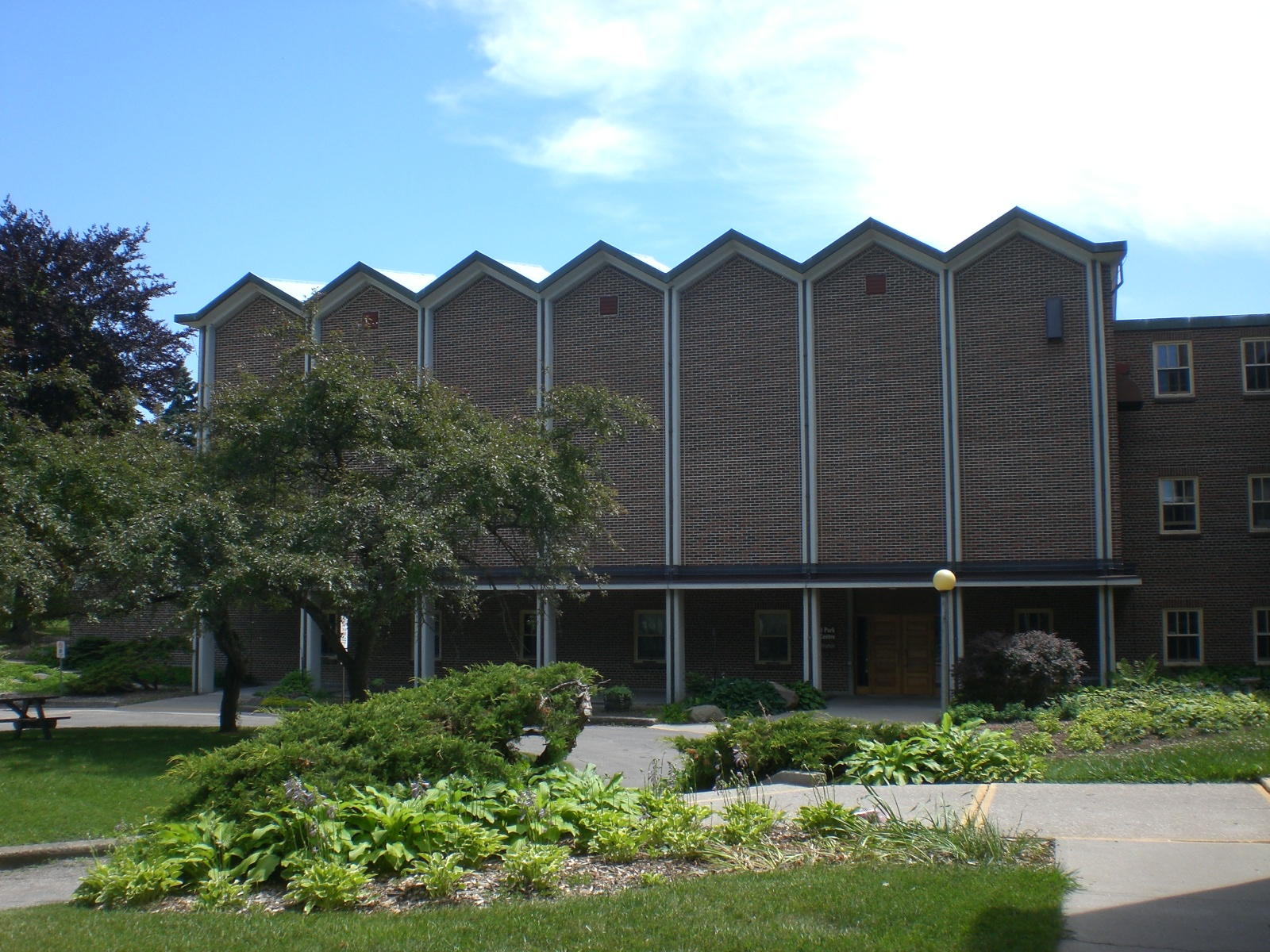
Old Chapel exterior

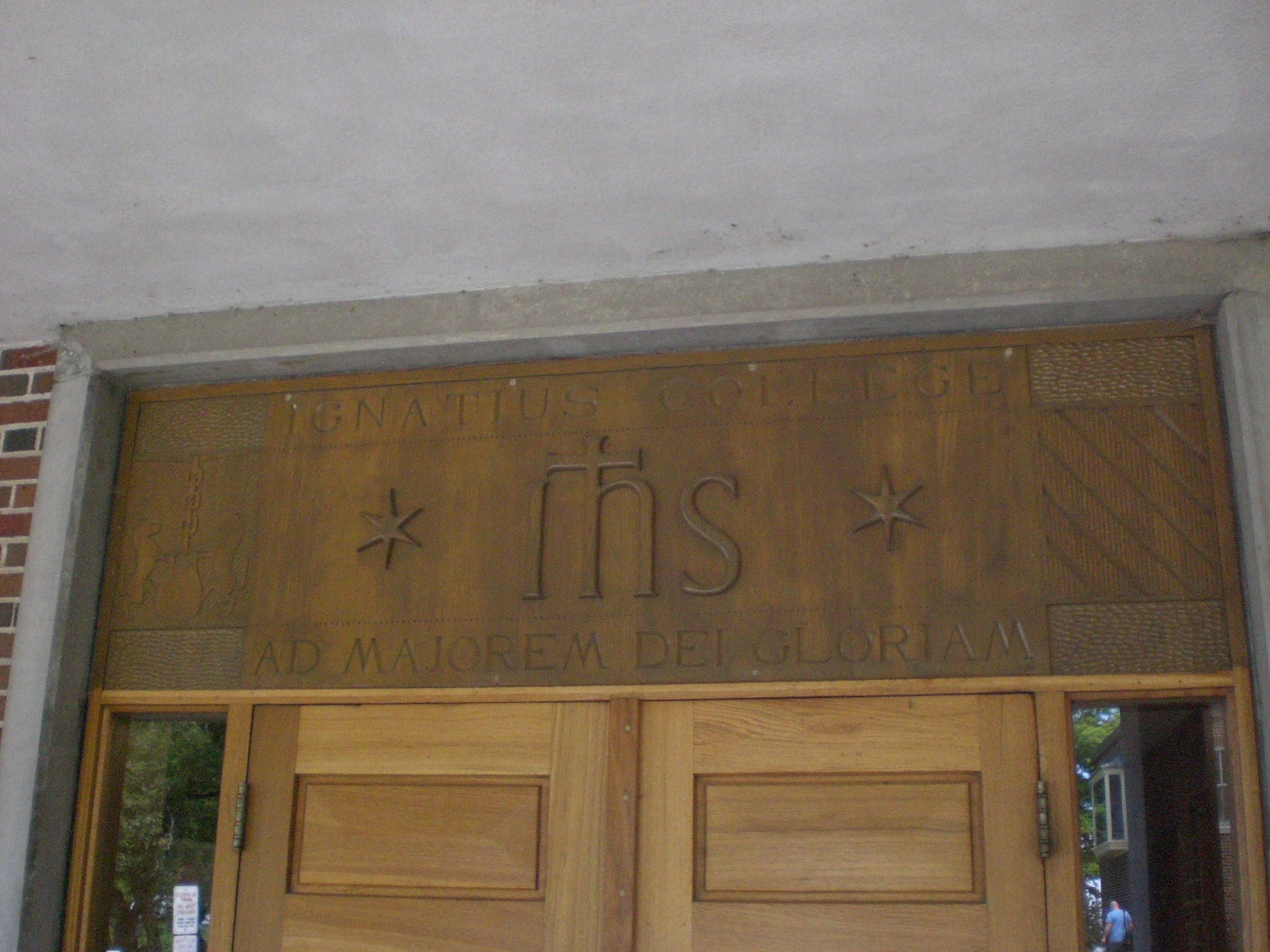
Main entrance to the old Ignatius College with inscription

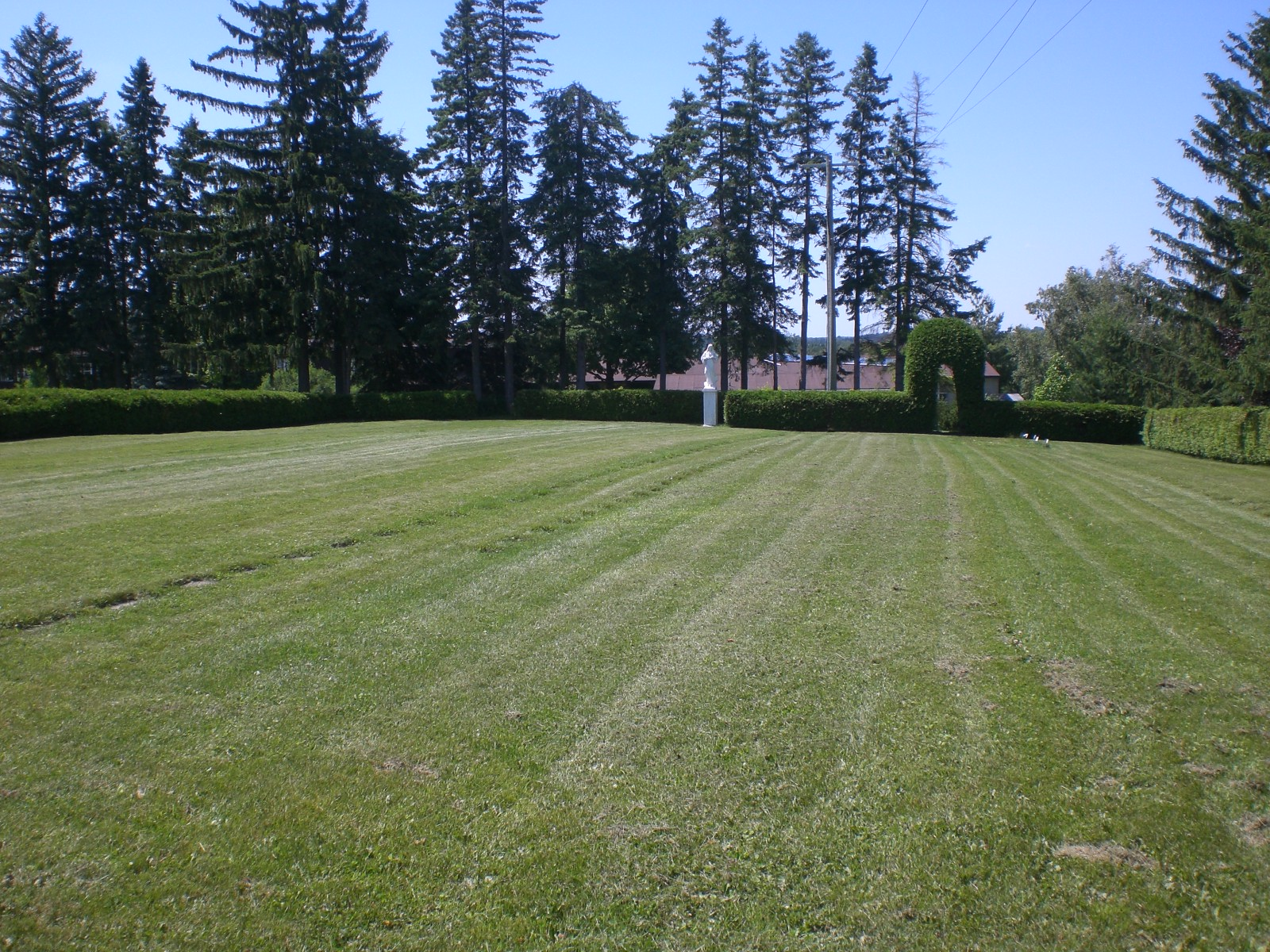
Jesuit cemetery

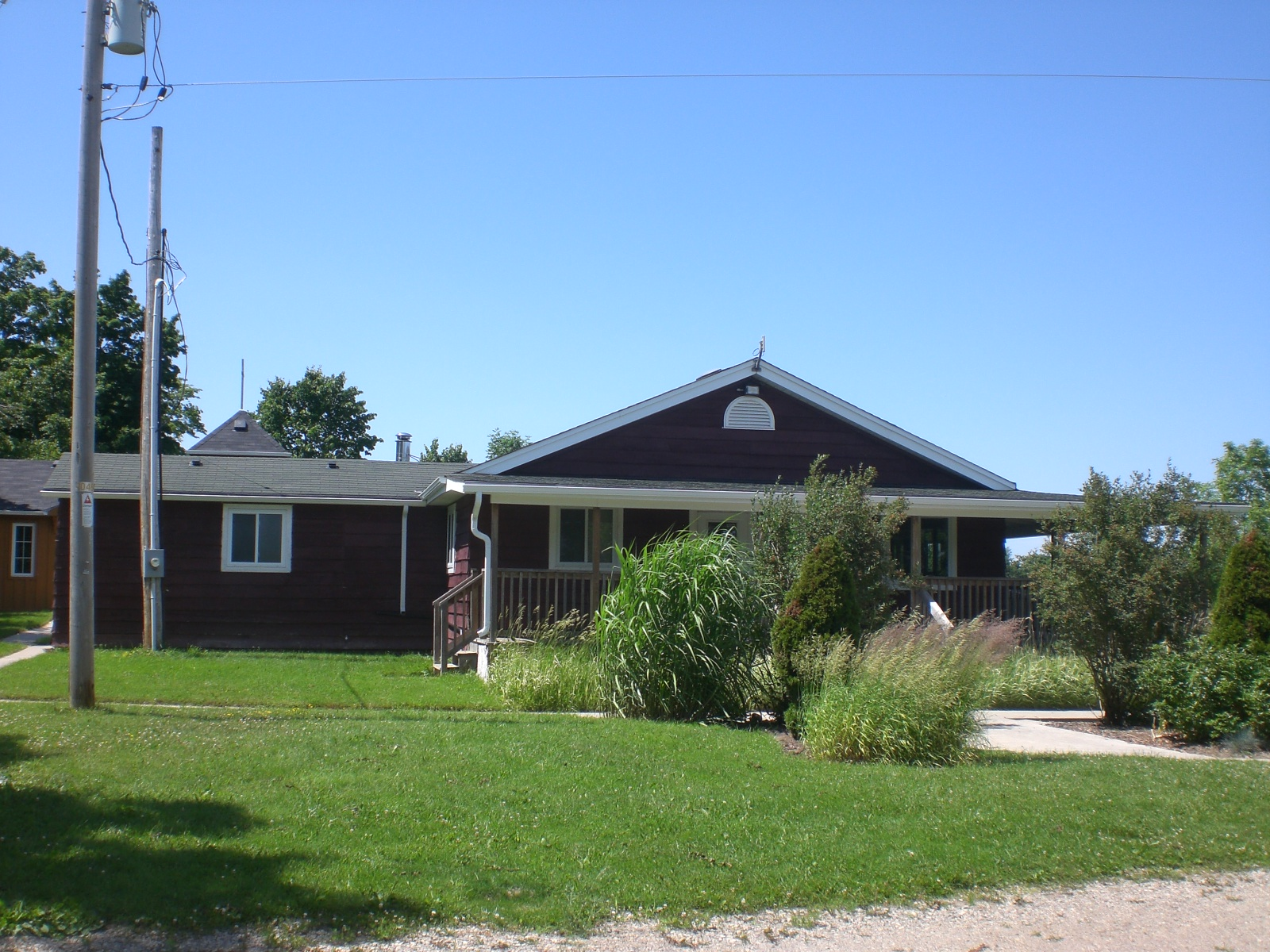
St. Brigid's Villa House in the grounds of the Ignatius Jesuit Centre

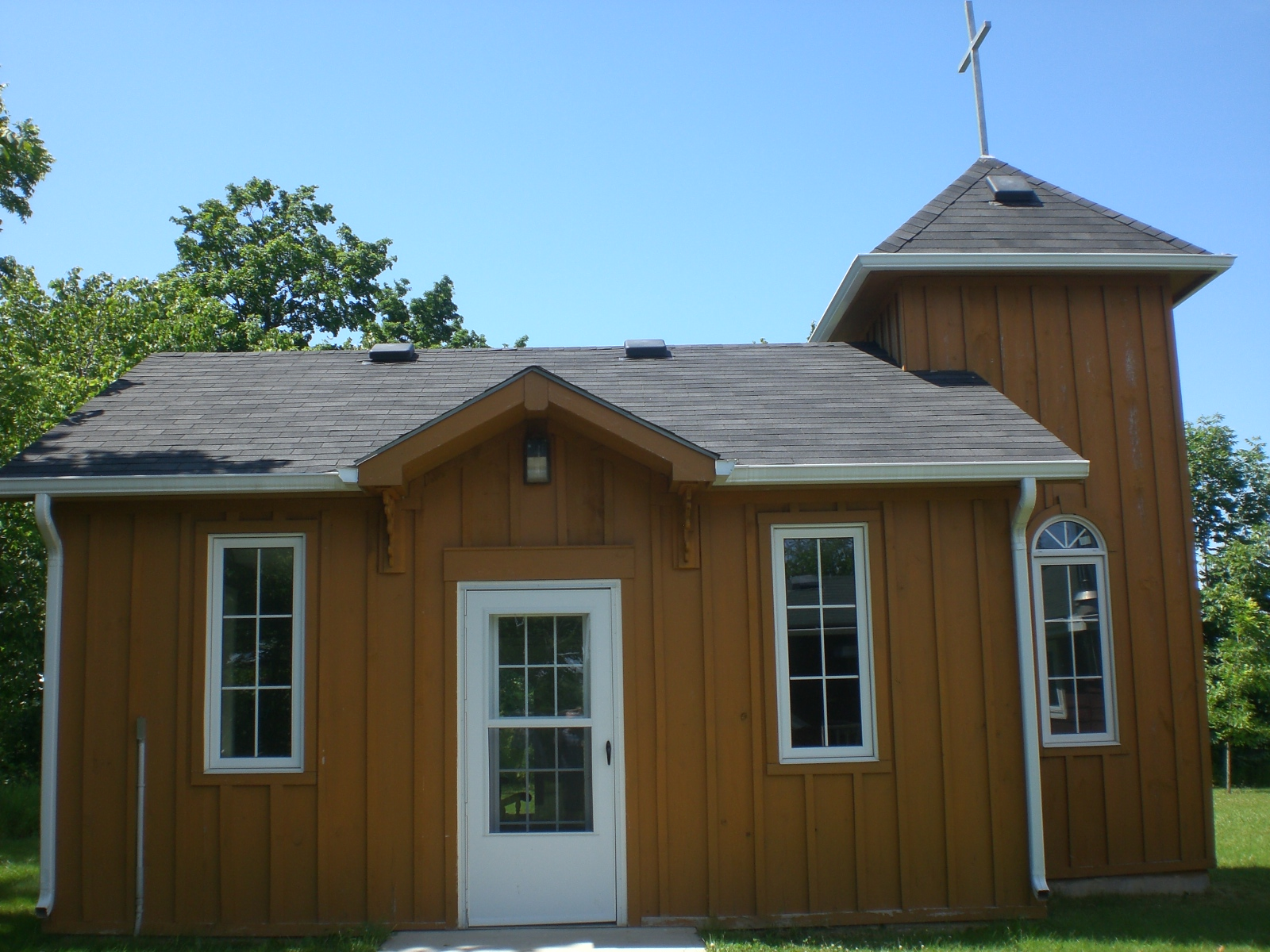
Chapel for St. Brigid's Villa

== See also ==
- List of Jesuit sites
- Loyola House Retreat and Training Centre
- Guelph Raid
- Holy Rosary Church, Guelph
