= Conscription Crisis of 1917 =

Canadian political controversy

Conscription Crisis of 1917–1918
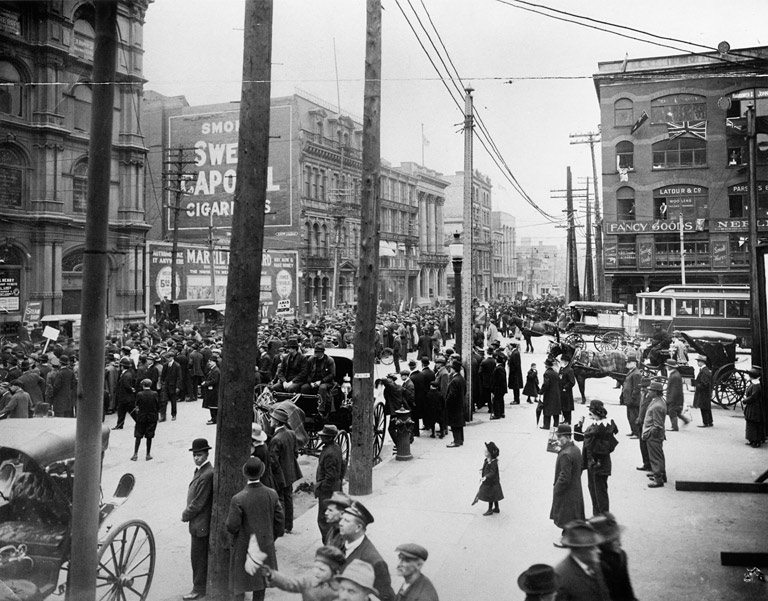
- An anti-conscription parade in Montreal on May 17, 1917
- Date: 1917–18
- Location: Quebec
- Caused by: Military Service Act, Conscription
- Goals: Repeal the Military Service Act; End conscription in Canada
- Methods: Mass protests, riots
- Result: Parliament passes the Military Service Act

Parties
Imperialists: Prime Minister's Office; Conservative Party; Liberal–Unionists; Ministry of Militia	Nationalists: His Majesty's Opposition; Laurier Liberals; Pacifists and anti-war protesters

Lead figures
Sir Robert Borden; Sir Albert Edward Kemp	Sir Wilfrid Laurier; Henri Bourassa

The Conscription Crisis of 1917 (French: Crise de la conscription de 1917) was a political and military crisis in Canada during World War I. It was mainly caused by disagreement on whether men should be conscripted to fight in the war, but also brought out many issues regarding relations between French Canadians and English Canadians. The vast majority of French Canadians opposed conscription; they felt that they had no particular loyalty to either Britain or France. Led by Henri Bourassa, they felt their only loyalty was to Canada. English Canadians supported the war effort as they felt stronger ties to the British Empire. On January 1, 1918, the Unionist government began to enforce the Military Service Act. The Act caused 404,385 men to be liable for military service, from which 385,510 sought exemption.

The most violent opposition occurred in Quebec City, where anti-war attitudes sparked a weekend of rioting between March 28 and April 1, 1918. The disturbances began on a Thursday when the Dominion Police detained a French-Canadian man who had failed to present his draft exemption papers. Despite the man's release, an angry mob of nearly 200 soon descended upon the St. Roch District Police Station where the man had been held. Rioters then ransacked the conscription registration office as well as two pro-conscription newspapers within Quebec City. The final and bloodiest conflict happened Easter Monday when crowds once again organized against the military presence in the city, which by then had grown to 1,200 soldiers. The soldiers were ordered to fire on the crowds, immediately causing them to disperse. Though the actual number of civilian casualties is debated, official reports from that day name five men killed by gunfire. Dozens more were injured. Among the soldiers are 32 recorded injuries that day, with no deaths. Monday, April 1, marked the end of the Easter Riots, which totalled over 150 casualties and $300,000 in damage.

== Background ==
Canada entered World War I on 4 August 1914. Colonel Sam Hughes was the Canadian Minister of Militia, and on 10 August he was permitted to create a militia of 25,000 men. Before the end of August 1914, Hughes had already created a training camp at Valcartier, Quebec, which was capable of housing 32,000 men. The first contingent of 31,200 Canadians, dubbed "Canada's Answer", arrived in Britain on October 14 for continued training. Hughes moved with incredible speed to create Canadian battalions which allowed Canadian troops to be kept together as units for the first time.

Relatively few French Canadians volunteered. The experience of the first contingent suggested that they could expect nothing but ill-treatment as French-speaking Catholics in English-speaking battalions filled with what they perceived as mostly Protestant men and officers who were unable to communicate with them. Young French Canadians seeking to serve, chose, instead, the few traditional "French" regiments of the Canadian militia, such as Les Fusiliers Mont-Royal, where barracks life was in French, and only the command language was in English. They had to be turned away because the Minister of Militia and his subordinates were obstinate in their refusal to mobilize these traditionally French regiments or to create new ones. However, the government continued to raise its expectations for volunteers, aiming for 150,000 men by 1915. English Canadians did not believe that French Canada was providing a fair share to the war effort. Sam Hughes, in June 1917, informed the House of Commons that of the 432,000 Canadian volunteers fewer than 5% came from French Canada, which made up 28% of the Canadian population at that time. There have been many reasons proposed for the lack of Québécois volunteers; however, many prominent Canadian historians suggest that the Ontario government's move to disallow French language instruction in Regulation 17 as the main reason.

Political pressure in Quebec, along with some public rallies, demanded the creation of French-speaking units to fight a war that was viewed as being right and necessary by many Quebecers, despite Regulation 17 in Ontario and the resistance in Quebec of those such as Henri Bourassa. Indeed, Montreal's La Presse editorialized that Quebec should create a contingent to fight as part of the French Army. When the government relented, the first new unit was the 22nd (French Canadian) Battalion, CEF. While a few other French-speaking groups were also allowed to be created, mostly by Reserve officers, they were all disbanded to provide replacements for the 22nd, which suffered close to 4,000 wounded and killed in the course of the war.

As the war dragged on, soldiers and politicians soon realized there would be no quick end. Eventually, people learned of the trench conditions and some casualties in Europe, and men stopped volunteering. There were over 300,000 recruits by 1916, but Prime Minister Robert Borden had promised 500,000 by the end of that year, even though Canada's population was only 8 million at the time.

== Conscription Crisis 1917 ==
After the Battle of the Somme, Canada was in desperate need to replenish its supply of soldiers; however, there were very few volunteers to replace them. The recruiting effort in Quebec had failed, and the Canadian government turned to its only remaining option: conscription.

Almost all French Canadians opposed conscription; they felt that they had no particular loyalty to either Britain or France. Led by Henri Bourassa, they felt their only loyalty was to Canada. English Canadians supported the war effort as they felt stronger ties to the British Empire. The Conscription Crisis of 1917 caused a considerable rift along ethnic lines between Anglophones and Francophones.

After visiting Britain for a meeting of First Ministers in May 1917, Borden announced that he would introduce the Military Service Act on August 29, 1917. The Act was passed: allowing the government to conscript men aged 20 to 45 across the country if the Prime Minister felt that it was necessary.

== The election of 1917 ==
To solidify support for conscription in the 1917 election, Borden extended the vote through the Military Voters Act to overseas soldiers, who were in favour of conscription to replace their depleted forces (women serving as nurses were also given the right to vote). For Borden, these votes had another advantage, as they could be distributed in any riding, regardless of the soldier's regular place of residence. With the Wartime Elections Act, women who were the wives, sisters, daughters and mothers of men serving overseas were also granted the right to vote in this election, as they appeared to be more patriotic and more worthy of a public voice. On the other hand, conscientious objectors and recent immigrants from "enemy countries" were denied the right to vote. In the election, Borden was opposed not only by Bourassa but also by Liberal Party leader Wilfrid Laurier, though he had been abandoned by much of his party. Laurier had opposed conscription from the beginning of the war, arguing that an intense campaign for volunteers would produce enough troops. He privately felt that if he joined the coalition government, Quebec would fall under what he perceived as a dangerous nationalism of Bourassa, which might ultimately lead to Quebec leaving the Canadian Confederation.

Borden's Unionist Party won the election with 153 seats; Laurier's Liberals secured 82 seats, 62 from Quebec.

== Conscription in practice ==
After the Military Service Act was passed in 1917 tensions ran high throughout Canada. Not all Canadians were as enthusiastic about joining the war effort as the first Canadian volunteer had been. In fact, many people objected to the idea of war completely. The conscientious objectors or unwilling soldiers sought exemption from combat. Instead, many joined the Non-Combatant Corps, where they took on other roles. Their duties consisted of cleaning and other labour. They did not carry weapons but were expected to dress in uniform, and they practised regular army discipline. Often the conscientious objector was abused, deemed a coward, and stripped of basic rights. In the British House of Commons, a resolution for the disenfranchisement of conscientious objectors was defeated by 141 to 71. Lord Hugh Cecil, who was a well-known churchman and statesman, said that he was "entirely out of sympathy for conscientious objectors, but he could not force them to do what they thought was wrong or punish them for refusing to do something they thought was wrong".

However, the government was making an effort to be sympathetic toward those who refused to take part in military service. Many communities set up local tribunals. If a man refused to serve he was put in front of a panel of two judges: one appointed by a board of selection named by Parliament, and the other by the senior county judge. The man was to plead his case, and if the panel was not convinced, the man asking for exemption was allowed to appeal. If the judges found that it was best if the person stayed at home, then he was not sent overseas. Many Canadians were unhappy with the conscientious objectors' choice to refuse combat. Many people believed that if people were not willing to give service against the enemy, then the only choice for them was between civil or military prisons.

Conscription posed a difficult question for the government. Conscription was unprecedented, and the problem proved to be that the government did not know who was best suited to become a soldier, a toolmaker or a farmer. The issue of manpower and ensuring that the proper men were being relocated to the most appropriate roles overseas was an issue that lasted the duration of the war.

== Imperialism and nationalism ==
Even though 35,000 French Canadians served overseas throughout the war, the conscription question resulted in French Canadians feeling more isolated than ever from the rest of Canada. They never fully supported the war effort, which resulted in the Federal government expressing deep concern over French Canada's nationalist and anti-war stance. For the first time in Canada's brief fifty-year history, there were substantial arguments being made in favour of revoking the Constitution Act of 1867. The nation was divided between English-speaking imperialists who supported the overseas war effort and French-speaking nationalists who believed that conscription was a second attempt to impose the Conquest, therefore it needed to be resisted at all costs. The Federal Conservatives had stated on numerous occasions that conscription would not be imposed.

Upon his return from London in May 1917, Borden met with his cabinet and announced that he would be imposing conscription. While in London, Borden had received a lot of pressure to send more troops to fully support the allied forces. He was convinced that Canada's war effort was weak and only conscription could make it respectable. All of his English-speaking ministers supported the idea. However, his two French-Canadian ministers were hesitant. They fully understood the negative reactions that French-Canadians would have. The French-Canadian nationalists who opposed conscription viewed it as neither necessary nor successful. They argued that it caused an avoidable rift between English and French-Canada. The debate surrounding conscription had a significant impact on both federal and provincial politics for many years following World War I.

== Quebec Easter riots and the end of the war ==
On January 1, 1918, the Unionist government began to enforce the Military Service Act. The Act made 404,385 men liable for military service, from which 385,510 sought exemptions. The Act was vague and offered many exemptions, and almost all of these men were able to avoid service, even if they had supported conscription. The most violent opposition occurred in Quebec, where anti-war attitudes drawn from French-Canadian nationalism sparked a weekend of rioting between March 28 and April 1. The disturbances began on a Thursday when the Dominion Police detained a French-Canadian man who had failed to present his draft exemption papers. Despite the man's release, a mob of nearly 200 soon descended upon the St. Roch District Police Station where the man had been held. By the following Good Friday evening, an estimated 15,000 rioters had ransacked the conscription registration office as well as two pro-conscription newspapers within Quebec City.

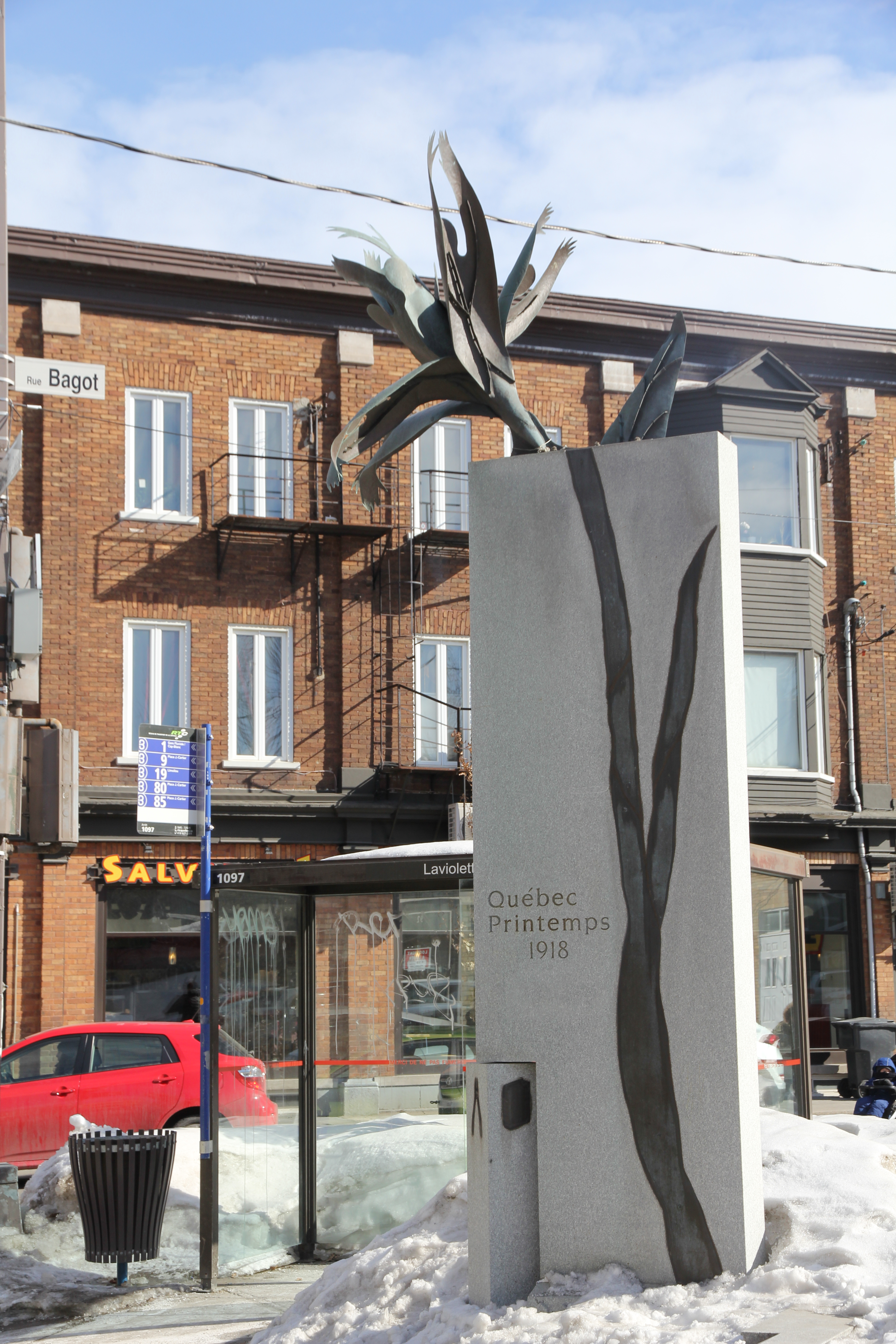
Monument entitled Québec, Printemps 1918, in Quebec City commemorating the four people who died in the riots of late March

This escalation of violence along with rumours of an alleged province-wide uprising prompted Quebec City Mayor Henri-Edgar Lavigueur to contact Ottawa and request reinforcements. Alarmed by the two days of rioting, the Borden government invoked the War Measures Act of 1914, which gave the federal government the power to directly oversee the maintenance of law and order in Quebec City. By the following morning, 780 soldiers had been deployed in the city, with an additional 1,000 en route from Ontario and 3,000 from western provinces. Despite their imminent arrival, protracted violence continued into the night of March 30, leading into a precarious Sunday. The final and bloodiest conflict happened Easter Monday when crowds once again organized against the military presence in the city, which by then had grown to 1,200 soldiers – all of whom came from Ontario. Once armed rioters began to fire on troops from concealed positions, the soldiers were ordered to fire on the crowds, immediately dispersing them. Though the actual number of civilian casualties is debated, official reports from that day name five men killed by gunfire; dozens more were injured. Among the soldiers are 32 recorded injuries that day, but no deaths. Monday, April 1, marked the end of the Easter Riots, which totalled over 150 casualties and $300,000 in damage.

The Easter Riots represent one of the most violent domestic disturbances in Canadian history. This stemmed from a clash between English Canada's linkage to the British Empire and opposing currents in French-Canadian nationalism, which became exacerbated during wartime and ultimately erupted over conscription. The severity and swiftness of Ottawa's response demonstrated their determination to impose conscription and prevent a national crisis. Moreover, the military crackdown which lasted in Quebec until the end of the war resulted in an increase in state power in the wake of growing French-Canadian nationalism.

By the spring of 1918, the government had amended the Act so that there were no exemptions, which left many English Canadians opposed as well. Even without exemptions, only about 125,000 men were ever conscripted, and only 24,132 of these were sent to the front. The war ended within a few months, but the issue left Canadians divided and distrustful of their government. In 1920, Borden retired, and his successor, Arthur Meighen, was defeated in the 1921 election. Conservatives had a difficult time in Quebec subsequently, with the Quebec Liberal Party holding power until August 1936, when Maurice Duplessis and the Union Nationale unseated Louis-Alexandre Taschereau's Quebec Liberals. Duplessis, however, was an ardent Québécois, and his party strongly opposed conscription throughout the Second World War. The Liberal Party in Quebec unseated Duplessis in October 1939 due to the Canadian Liberal Party committing to not impose conscription. But by August 1944, Duplessis had regained power in Quebec as the Liberal Party in Ottawa attempted, counter to their previous assurances, to again impose conscription on Quebec.

== See also ==
- Conscription in Canada
- Francœur Motion
- List of incidents of civil unrest in Canada
