= Military Service Act, 1917 =

Canadian political act aimed at recruiting soldiers during World War One

Parliament of Canada
- Long title: An Act respecting Military Service
- Citation: 7-8 Geo. V c. 19
- Territorial extent: Canada
- Royal assent: 29 August 1917
- Status: Repealed

The Military Service Act, 1917 (French: Loi concernant le Service militaire) was an Act passed by the Parliament of Canada which introduced conscription in the midst of the First World War. It was passed due to a shortage of volunteers and was an effort to conscript more soldiers.

== Background ==
Following the outbreak of the First World War, the Canadian Expeditionary Force was sent to the Western Front wherein high casualties were sustained. Volunteer enlistment was inconsistent, and it was believed that the Canadian Corps could not be maintained at full strength without conscription.

The Militia Act, 1904 already provided for military service for all male British subjects between the ages of 18 and 60, but the calling-up was by levée en masse, which would have caused massive disruption through the pulling of skilled workers from agriculture and industry.

Encouraged by the British and English Canadians, Prime Minister Sir Robert Borden introduced the Military Service Act. Riots broke out in Quebec.

== Provisions ==
Under the act, the male population of Canada was divided into several classes for the purpose of being called up for military service, from which certain exceptions were available, if they were:

- ordinarily resident in Canada; or
- has been at resident in Canada at any time since August 4, 1914, unless where he
- falls within one of the specified exceptions, or he
- reaches the age of 45 prior to his class or subclass being called up.

With the classes being:

1. Those who have the age of twenty years, born not earlier than 1883, and are unmarried or a widower with no child.
2. Those who have the age of twenty years, born not earlier than 1883, and are married or a widower with a child or children.
3. Those born in the years 1876 to 1882 inclusive, and are unmarried or a widower with no child.
4. Those born in the years 1876 to 1882 inclusive, and are married or a widower with a child or children.
5. Those born in the years 1872 to 1875 inclusive, and are unmarried or a widower with no child.
6. Those born in the years 1872 to 1875 inclusive, and are married or a widower with a child or children.

Any man married after July 6, 1917, was deemed to be unmarried.

The exceptions to the act were:

- Men who hold a certificate of exemption issued under the act.
- Members of His Majesty's regular, reserve or auxiliary forces.
- Members of military forces raised by any of the other Dominions or the Government of India.
- Men serving in the Royal Navy, the Royal Marines, the Naval Service of Canada or the Canadian Expeditionary Force.
- Men who have served since August 4, 1914, in the military or naval forces of Great Britain or her allies in any theatre of actual war, and have been honourably discharged.
- Clergy, members of holy orders and ministers of any religious denomination existing when the act came into force.
- Persons exempted from military service by the Orders in Council of August 13, 1873 (Note: which granted Mennonites exemption from military service) and December 6, 1898. (Note: which granted Doukhobors exemption from military service)

And finally the exemptions were:

1. Importance of continuing employment in habitual occupation.
2. Importance of employment in a special occupation for which one has special qualifications.
3. Importance of continuing education or training.
4. Serious hardship owing to exceptional financial obligations.
5. Serious hardship owing to exceptional business obligations.
6. Serious hardship owing to exceptional domestic position.
7. Ill health or infirmity.
8. Adherence to a religious denomination of which the articles of faith forbid combatant service.

== Amendments and regulations ==
=== Dominion Elections Act ===
Dominion Elections Act, s. 67A (Note: as inserted by The War-time Elections Act, S.C. 1917, c. 39, s. 2(e)) introduced an exception to the original Act:

- Anyone who has voted in a Dominion election after October 7, 1917, is ineligible and incompetent to obtain an exception by reason of being a Mennonite or Doukhobor.

And an additional exemption, alongside an removed exemption, to the act:

- British subjects naturalized after March 31, 1902 (together with their sons not yet of legal age) who were either born in an enemy country, or came from any European country and whose mother tongue is a language of an enemy country, are exempted from military service. (Note: By reason of having been declared ineligible to vote in Dominion elections, but certain exceptions could apply.)
- Anyone who has voted in a Dominion election after October 7, 1917, is ineligible and incompetent to obtain an exemption on conscientious grounds.

=== Regulations ===
Regulations under P.C. 919 of April 20, 1918 retooled the classes, stating;

- Class 1 and Class 2 shall include all those have attained the age of nineteen years, but were born on or since October 13, 1897, and are resident in Canada.
- Any person who subsequently reaches the age of nineteen, and is unmarried or a widower with no child, becomes immediately subject to military law and must present himself to the local registrar within the following ten days for the purpose of being placed on active service.

It also introduced a redefinition:

- The words "in any theatre of actual war" shall not include the high seas or Great Britain and Ireland.

Lastly, it removed previously granted and instead permitted ministerial discretion in individual cases:

- Any exemptions previously granted under the Act shall cease forthwith, but the Minister may grant leave of absence without pay by reason of death, disablement or service by other members of the same family while on active service in any actual theatre of war.

Regulations under P.C. 1250 of May 22, 1918

- Leave of absence without pay extended to those men being the sole support of widows, an invalid father, or other helpless dependants.

A system of local and appeal tribunals was in place for determining exemptions claimed under the act.

The men of Class 1 were called up to report for military service on November 10, 1917, with the deadline delayed until December 12, 1917, for those living in the Yukon Territory (who did not need to report for duty until January 7, 1918).

Men within any class who, after August 4, 1914, had moved to the United States or elsewhere were also required to submit to the provisions of the act.

Further regulations issued on April 30, 1918, required all persons claiming an exemption to carry documentation supporting such a claim, with lack of documentation resulting in detention without recourse to habeas corpus, and public notices of these regulations were published across Canada. This left farming operations across Canada short of much-needed labour.

== Conscripts raised ==
Men raised under the Military Service Act, 1917
Status of Men	Number
Class I Registrations	401,822
Granted exemption	221,949
Liable for Military Service	179,933
Unapprehended defaulters	24,139
Available but not called	26,225
Reported for Military Service	129,569
Permitted to enlist in Imperial forces	8,445
Taken on strength CEF	124,588
Performed no military service and found medically unfit, eligible for exemption or liable for non-combatant service only	16,300
Available for service with CEF units	108,288
Discharged prior to November 11, 1918	8,637
On strength CEF, November 11, 1918	99,651
Proceeded overseas	47,509
Taken on strength units in France	24,132 (Note: This total was debunked by Michel Gravel in 2005. The number of conscripts that reached the front has not yet been properly determined.)

== Postwar sanctions ==
After the war, Ontario passed legislation providing that, for a ten-year period from April 24, 1919, anyone who failed to perform any duty required under the Military Service Act, or was convicted of any treasonable or seditious offences during the war, was disqualified from holding any provincial, municipal or educational office, or from being able to vote at any related election for such offices.

== Impact ==
The act was unevenly administered, and there were numerous evasions and many exemptions. The Act's military value has been questioned, but its political consequences were clear. It led to Borden's Union government and drove most of his French Canadian supporters into opposition, as they were seriously alienated by this attempt to enforce their participation in an imperial war. Conflicts between the government's calls for greater agricultural production and conscription would lead to the rise of the farmers' movements of the 1920s, and would have more lasting effects in rural and Western alienation. Lessons learned from the First World War experience were used in framing the National Resources Mobilization Act that was passed in the Second World War.

The act fell into disuse, and was repealed as obsolete upon the proclamation of the Revised Statutes of Canada, 1952.

== See also ==
- Conscription in Canada
- Conscription Crisis of 1917
- Guelph Raid
- Alberta Supreme Court's difficulty with the order-in-council
