= Riverside Park (Guelph) =

Park in Ontario, Canada

Coordinates: 43.565°N 80.270°W

Riverside Park is an 80-acre (32-hectare) park located by the northern part of Woolwich Street in Guelph, Ontario, Canada. It is built around a portion of the Speed River that runs through Guelph.

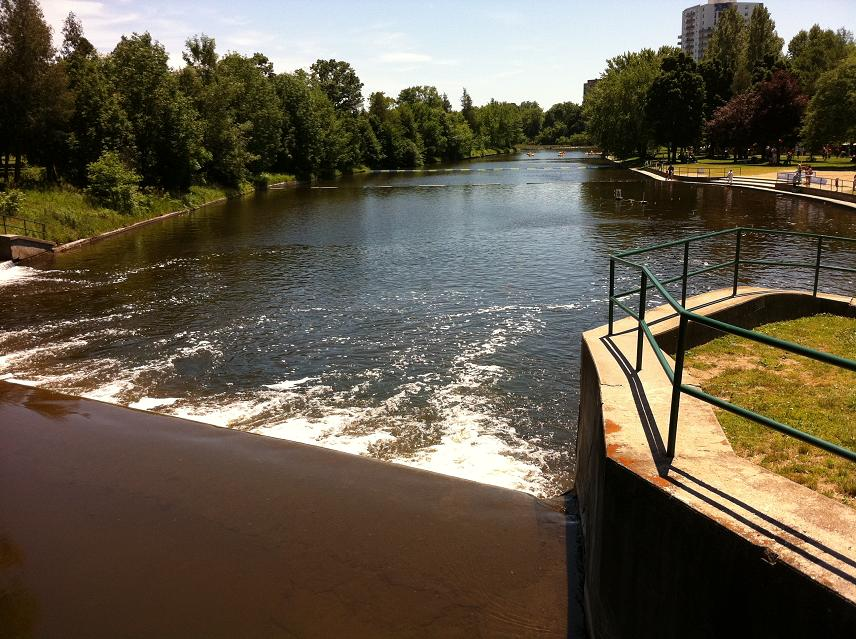
Riverside Park

== History ==
Riverside Park opened in 1905 spanning 14.5 acres. Its development was related to the Guelph's now discontinued streetcar system. The park was a stop on one of the Guelph Radial Railway's (a precursor to the modern Guelph Transit system) streetcar line, and the company held a contest in 1905 to name the new attraction. The name “Riverside Park”, from the site's proximity to the Speed River, was the winning selection.

The city had been encouraged to open a major park by prominent citizen James Walter Lyon, partly to increase volume for the streetcar operation. The property had been privately owned as the Lace Farm until it was acquired and modified by the city. The plan was successful for the radial railway. In early days, the park included an "ice-cream building, bandstand, swings, and zoo" according to records and public swimming by both sexes was encouraged. Dressing rooms were constructed.

Since its foundation the park has expanded to 80-acres, with many on-site features and has become a noted landmark and attraction in the city.

== Features ==
=== Antique Carousel ===
The fully operational antique carousel (circa 1919) designed by Allan Herschell in Riverside Park contains 3 rows consisting of 2 menagerie animals (i.e., a pig and rooster) and 28 jumping horses. Four chariot carousels are evenly spaced among the horses and animals. This carousel is one of the few remaining antique wooden horse carousels in Canada and the United States as there are only 148 in existence. The City of Guelph bought it from Conklin Garrett traveling amusements (Brantford) in 1970 for $6000. It remained in operation until 1976 when it was closed for three years due to disrepair. In 1979, it reopened after a campaign in 1976 led by lawyer John Valeriote and local artist Ken Danby ensued to save the carousel. Numerous repairs and modifications over the years have helped to keep the carousel operational. For years, the carousel was fully dismantled before the winter months until 1999 when a permanent structure was built, including a mural painted by local artist, Greg Elliott 3 years later.Picture It is operational from mid May to mid October for a small admission fee.

=== Miniature Train ===
The "Riverside Express" (circa 1964) is the miniature train found in Riverside Park. It is a fully operational mini replica of a 1950's locomotive. It's 650 m rounded triangular shaped track travels about 5–10 km/hour and is operational from mid May to mid October with a small admission fee. Picture

=== Floral Clock ===
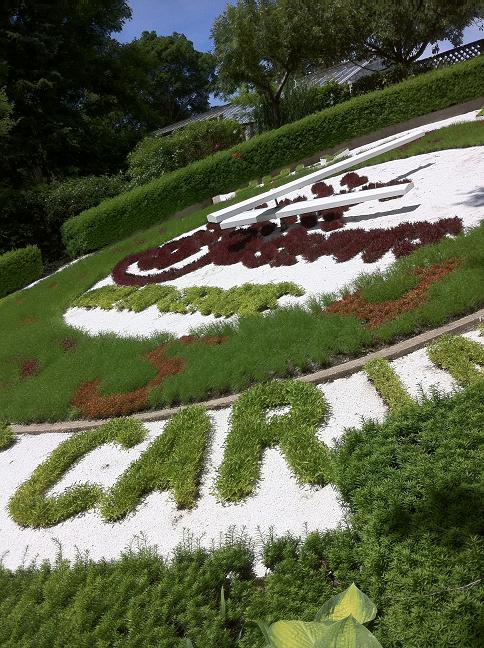
Riverside Park's Floral Clock

The floral clock of Riverside Park is mechanized and fully functional, showcasing over 6000 plants. The only mechanized components seen from the exterior are its hands. It is 28 feet in diameter and displays numeric floral patterns on its face, each number spanning 4 feet. Each year floral patterns are changed to celebrate different events or people, and in winter the Arabic numbers are replaced with illuminated Roman numerals. In the start of 2011, a floral arrangement commemorating St. Joseph's health centre was made. The clock also exhibits a floral calendar that is changed daily.

The floral clock was originally built in 1949 and rebuilt in 1955 according to the designs of John “Jock” Clark, the city's long-time park administrator. The floral clock at Riverside Park is the only patented floral clock in Canada.

=== The Model House ===
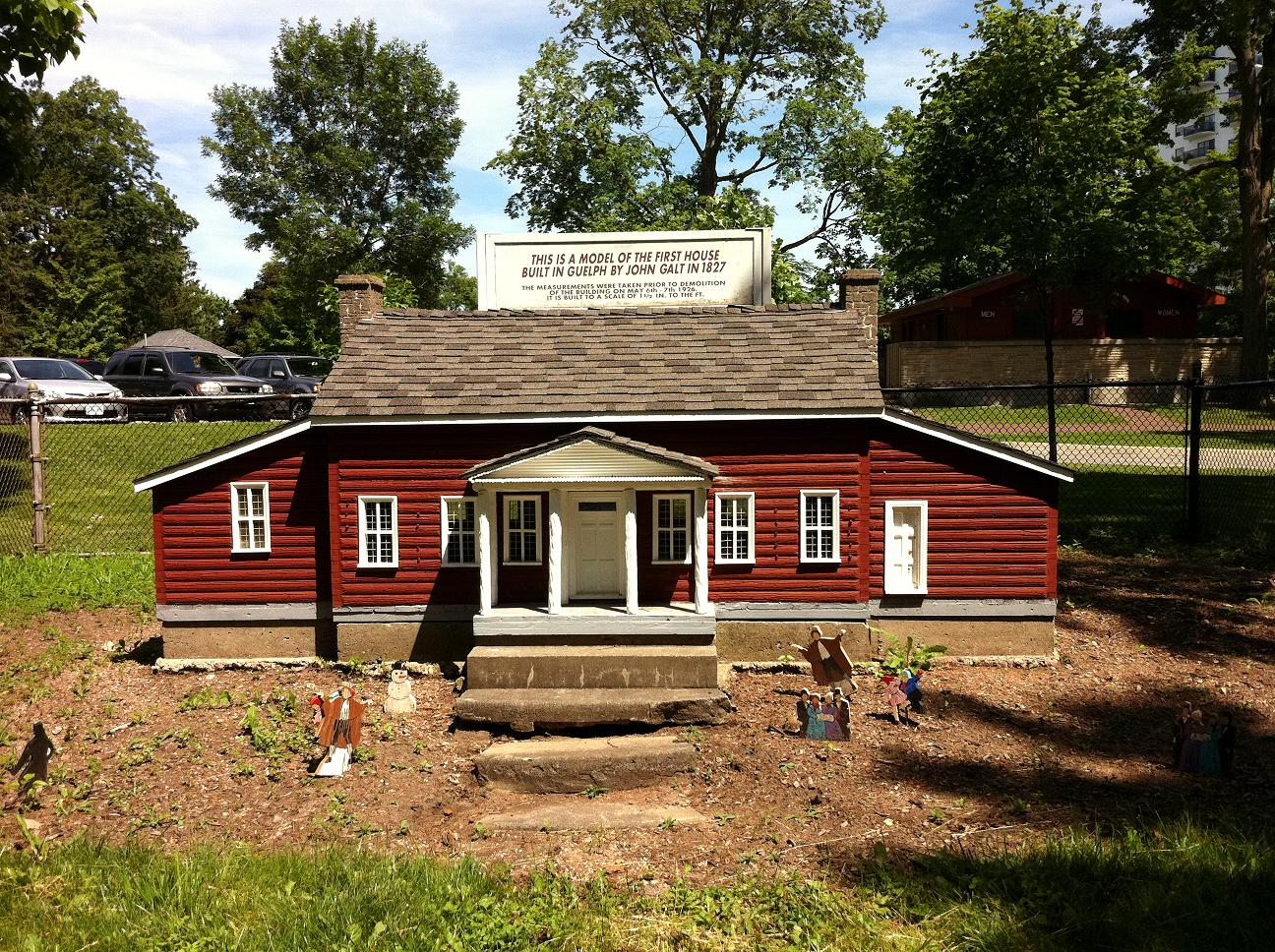
Riverside Park's Model House

Near the west entrance to the park is a model of the first house built in the city of Guelph. John Galt built the original house in 1827 where he and his family held residence. The house, christened The Priory, was named after Charles Prior, one of the men that aided Galt in Guelph's founding. The Priory was a cabin made up of laterally stacked logs and served multiple purposes. It also functioned as a tavern, a post-office and in 1887 a railway station. A to-scale model of this house was built and is now on display behind a perimeter of fencing at Riverside Park. The model is scaled to a ratio of 1 ½ In. to the Ft.

=== The Speed River ===
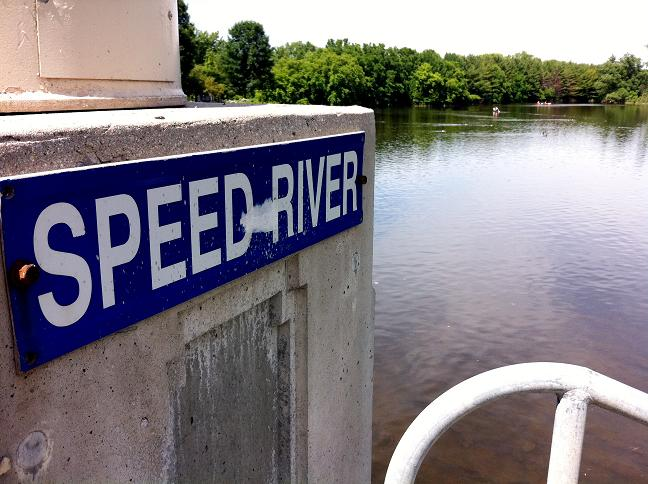
The Speed River from Riverside Park

The Speed River runs alongside the parklands. The river provides many benefits to the ecosystem of the park. Such benefits include: filtration of the riparian zone, food and habitation, conservation, prevention of soil erosion, increases in aqueous oxygen levels and shade along the riverside which reduces water temperature. The use of chemical herbicides and pesticides is prohibited within the riparian zone in an effort to sustain this natural buffer. Riverside Park hosts activities such as paddleboat rides, fishing, dragon-boat races and ice skating by the Speed River. It also hosts non-profit charitable events.

=== Flora ===
The species of the plant life at Riverside Park include:

- Agastache ‘Blue Fortune’ – Giant Blue Hyssop
- Andropogon gerardi – Big Blue Stem
- Asclepias incarnata ‘Ice Ballet’ – White Swamp Milkweed
- Asclepias tuberosa – Butterfly Weed
- Aster × dumosus ‘Wood’s Purple’ – Hardy Aster
- Coreopsis ‘Galaxy’ – Hybrid Tickseed
- Echinacea purpurea ‘Magnus’ – Purple Cone Flower
- Gaillardia × grandifloraa ‘Oranges And Lemons’ – Blanket Flower
- Hypericum calycinum ‘Baby Lion’ – St. John's Wort
- Liatris spicata ‘Alba’ –White Blazing Star
- Liatris spicata ‘Kobold’ – Blazing Star
- Rudbeckia laciniata ‘Herbstonne’ –Green-headed Coneflower, Autumn Sun Cone Flower, Cut-leaf/Lance-leaf Coneflower
- Schizachyrium scoparium – Little Blue Stem

=== Woody Plants ===
- Amelanchier sp., likely A. canadensis – Service Berry
- Aronia arbutifolia ‘Brilliantissima’ – Red Chokeberry
- Cercis canadensis - Redbud
- Cornus racemosa – Grey Dogwood or Cornus amomum – Silky Dogwood
- Cornus stolonifera / C. sericea – Red Osier Dogwood
- Lonicera involucrata – Twin Berry
- Sambucus pubens – Red American Elderberry
- Staphylea trifolia – American Bladder Nut
- Symphoricarpos sp. – may be S. albus - Snowberry, or S. orbiculatus, or one of the S. x doorenbosii hybrids – Coral berry
- Syringa vulgaris – Common Lilac

== Activities ==
As of 2019, Riverside Park offers a leash free area, baseball diamonds, a playground, an area for disc golf, picnic tables, washrooms, a miniature train, walking trails, and a vintage carousel manufactured in 1919.

Riverside Park's walking trails are connected to the surrounding neighborhoods, and to the City Centre. Paddleboat and pedal boat rides are available along the Speed River. The park also has a giant chessboard and a beach.

During the winter, Riverside Park offers activities such as cross-country skiing and outdoor ice skating on the Speed River.

== Special Events ==
=== Canada Day ===
Riverside Park offers this annual event in celebration of Canada Day. The event involves carousel rides, train rides and pony rides. Riverside Park offers other activities during this event such as live music, a petting zoo, a bouncy castle, gigantic slides, face painting, duck races, art in the park, environment displays and food venues. At the end of the day, there is a display of fireworks.

=== New Year's Eve Fireworks ===
Riverside Park has a display of fireworks for its annual New Year's Eve celebration. Riverside Park allows everyone who attends the event to ride the carousal for free. When it begins to get dark outside, a Festive Light Display is turned on. Throughout the park, lights in the shape of Santa, reindeer, snowmen, and carolers are put on display. At midnight, fireworks are displayed.

=== Multicultural Festival ===
This annual free event has been held by Guelph at the Riverside Park for 25 years over a weekend in June. Sponsored by local businesses, the festival celebrates Guelph's diversity. A Multicultural Award is also issued to a student, person, or organization that “promotes peaceful relationships, cultural understanding and an appreciation of our cultural diversities”. The festival has been known to draw about 20,000 people over two days.

=== Ribfest ===
Guelph has held an annual 3-day Ribfest at Riverside Park for over a decade. The event was started by the Rotary Club of Guelph-Trillium, with the proceeds going towards pre-applied charities. Guelph's Ribfest is generally sponsored by both local businesses and larger corporations like Sleeman Breweries. In addition to rib tasting and contests, it includes live entertainment, a classic car show, and the opportunity for fans to meet members of the Guelph Storm. The event has been known to have drawn almost 50,000 visitors over the course of three days on one occasion.

=== Festival of Lights ===
The annual Festival of Lights takes place at Riverside Park and is entitled "Sparkles in The Park". The event typically takes place beginning in the middle of December and is open to the public nightly from 5:30 PM. Sparkles in the Park begins with an opening celebration that includes a visit from Santa Claus and culminates with a large fireworks display on New Year's Eve that always draws a crowd. The Rotary Club of Guelph puts on the event as support to their selected charities. There is also a Christmas light display set-up throughout the park.

=== Pollinator Day ===
This event is spearheaded by an environmental advocacy group known as Pollination Guelph. Pollination Guelph is a non-profit, federally incorporated organization, devoted to the protection of the natural ecosystem. They use Pollinator Day to spread awareness and host workshops to educate attendees. Besides offering general knowledge about the process of pollination, they illustrate how to attract pollinating species of birds and insects, build bee nests, raise butterflies and differentiate between pollinating and non-pollinating plant species. At Riverside Park, participants of Pollinator Day also get to aid in the planting of dozens of pollinating species.
