= Centre justice et foi =

Canadian centre for social analysis

Coordinates: 45.538636°N 73.632097°W

- Centre Justice et Foi logo with the motto, 'Au coeur des débats de société'

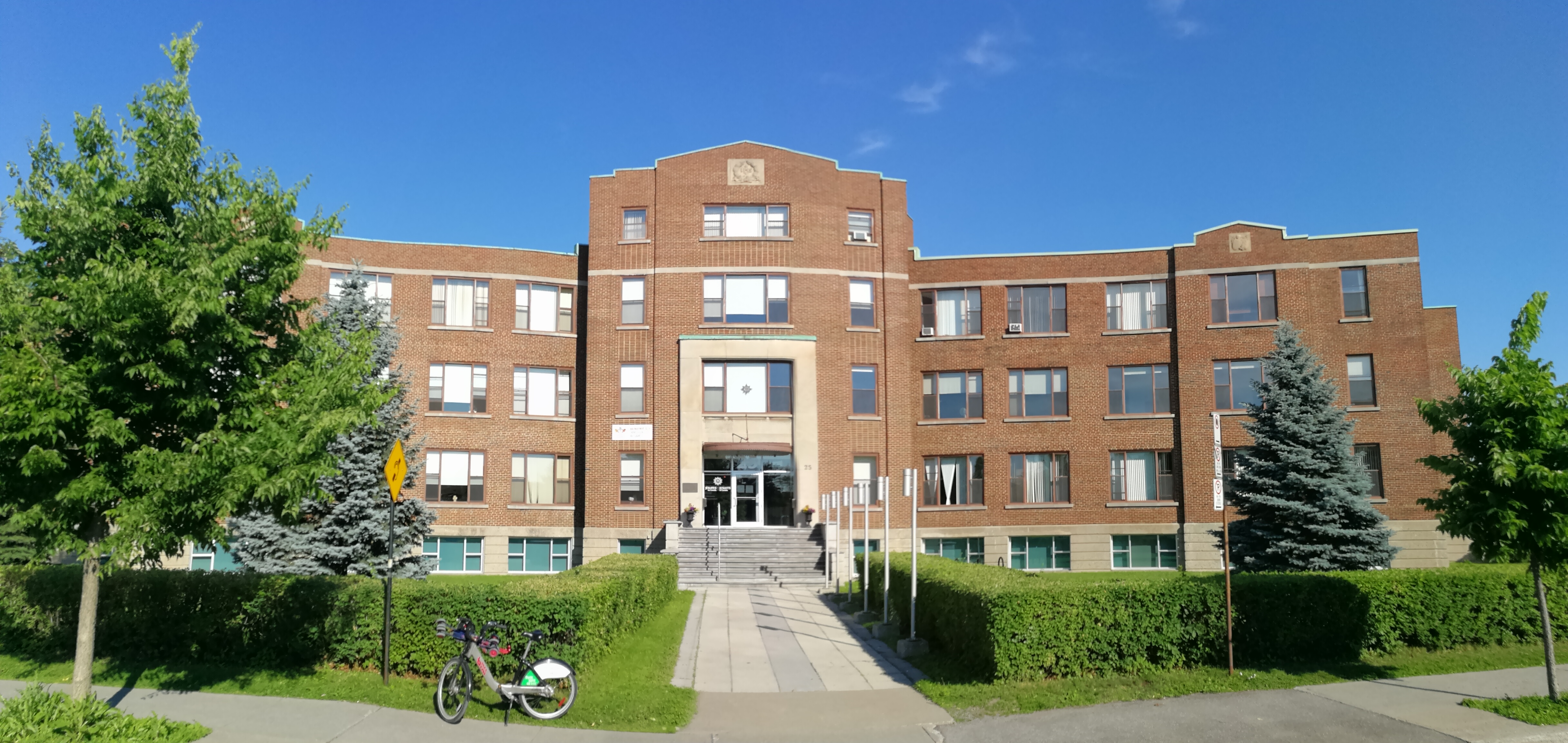
- Centre Justice et Foi office in Maison Bellarmin, Montreal
- Abbreviation: CJF
- Predecessor: École sociale populaire
- Established: 1983; 43 years ago
- Official language: French
- Main organ: Relations
- Parent organization: Society of Jesus

Centre justice et foi (English: Centre for Justice and Faith), abbreviated to CJF, is a centre for social analysis in Montreal. It was founded by the Society of Jesus in 1983 and publishes the magazine Relation (French: Revue Relations). It is situated on the corner of Saint Laurent Boulevard and Jarry Street opposite Jarry Park.

== History ==
In 1911, the Archbishop of Montreal, Paul Bruchési with the Society of Jesus created the foundation École sociale populaire to help the Catholic Church adapt to the needs of people living in the expanding urban centres of the 20th century. It drew its inspiration from Catholic social teaching laid out in Pope Leo XIII's encyclical Rerum novarum in 1891. The foundation continued under the leadership of Joseph-Papin Archambault during the 1940s and 1950s. During that time the journal Relations was published by the foundation.

In 1983, the Society of Jesus in French-speaking Canada created the centre to follow in the tradition of the foundation and took over publication of Relations. It is concerned with the themes of social justice, gender equality, religious pluralism and the welfare of refugees. Although it was founded by the Jesuits, it is led by non-Jesuits, its current director is Elizabeth Guarantor. It also works with non-Jesuits, such as the theologian Gregory Baum. Its English-speaking Canadian counterpart is the Jesuit Forum for Social Faith and Justice.

== Relations ==
In 1941, the foundation École sociale populaire started the journal Relations to further Catholic social teaching. Inspired by the Second Vatican Council and the then Superior General of the Society of Jesus, Pedro Arrupe it is orientated towards social justice and liberation theology.

== See also ==
- List of Jesuit sites
