= 1942 Canadian conscription plebiscite =

Canadian referendum on conscription during the Second World War

- April 27, 1942
- Are you in favour of releasing the Government from any obligations arising out of any past commitments restricting the methods of raising men for military service?
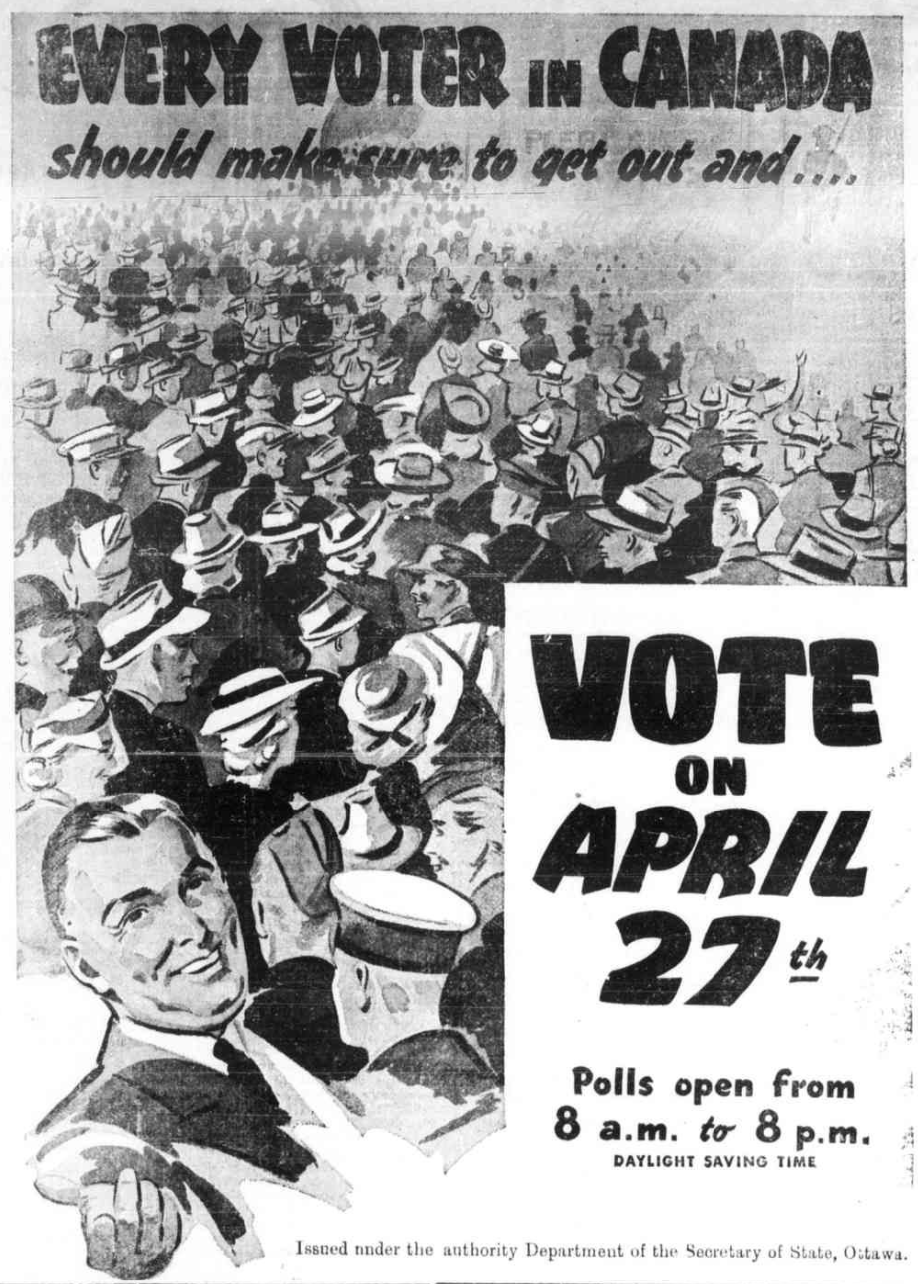
- Advertisement appearing in The Canadian Champion (Milton, Ontario, April 23, 1942) soliciting votes for the 1942 Canadian conscription plebiscite.

Results
| Choice | Votes | % |
|---|---|---|
| Yes | 2,945,514 | 65.62% |
| No | 1,543,006 | 34.38% |
| Valid votes | 4,488,520 | 96.76% |
| Invalid or blank votes | 150,327 | 3.24% |
| Total votes | 4,638,847 | 100.00% |
| Registered voters/turnout | 6,502,234 | 71.34% |
Results by province and territory
| Yes 60–69% 70–79% 80–89% | No 70–79% |

A plebiscite on conscription was held in Canada on 27 April 1942. It was held in response to the Conservative Party lobbying Prime Minister William Lyon Mackenzie King (Liberal leader) to introduce compulsory overseas military service, the government having previously promised not to introduce same in 1940. The result was 66% voting in favour, with Quebec being the only province to have a majority voting against. Quebec's strong majority against the commitment's release prompted the prime minister not to pursue the issue until later events prompted a change in position.

== Content ==
The following question appeared on the ballot:

Are you in favour of releasing the Government from any obligations arising out of any past commitments restricting the methods of raising men for military service?
French: Consentez-vous à libérer le gouvernement de toute obligation résultant d'engagements antérieurs restreignant les méthodes de mobilisation pour le service militaire?

== Opinion polling ==
| Completion Date | Polling firm | Source | Yes | No | Undecided | Lead |
|---|---|---|---|---|---|---|
| April 27, 1942 | Official results | | 65.62% | 34.38% | | 31.24% |
| March 1942 | Gallup | | 64 | 28 | 8 | 36 |
| February 1942 | Gallup | | 60 | 24 | 16 | 36 |
| December 27, 1941 | Gallup | | 60 | 30 | 10 | 30 |

=== Quebec polling only ===
| Completion Date | Polling firm | Source | Yes | No | Lead |
|---|---|---|---|---|---|
| April 27, 1942 | Official results | | 27.9% | 72.1% | 44.2% |
| March 1942 | Gallup | | 25 | 75 | 50 |
| February 1942 | Gallup | | 39 | 61 | 22 |

== Results ==
=== National ===
Canadian conscription plebiscite, 1942 National results
| Choice | Votes | % |
|---|---|---|
| For | 2,945,514 | 65.62 |
| Against | 1,543,006 | 34.38 |
| Total | 4,488,520 | 100.00 |
| Valid votes | 4,488,520 | 98.89 |
| Invalid/blank votes | 50,327 | 1.11 |
| Total votes | 4,538,847 | 100.00 |
| Registered voters/turnout | 6,502,234 | 69.80 |
Source: Nohlen

=== By province ===
Canadian conscription plebiscite, 1942 Provincial results
| Jurisdiction | Yes | | No | |
| Jurisdiction | Votes | % | Votes | % |
|---|---|---|---|---|
| Alberta | 186,624 | 71.1 | 75,880 | 28.9 |
| British Columbia | 253,844 | 80.4 | 62,033 | 19.6 |
| Manitoba | 218,093 | 80.3 | 53,651 | 19.7 |
| New Brunswick | 105,629 | 69.8 | 45,743 | 30.2 |
| Nova Scotia | 120,763 | 77.1 | 35,840 | 22.1 |
| Ontario | 1,202,953 | 84.0 | 229,847 | 16.0 |
| Prince Edward Island | 23,569 | 82.9 | 4,869 | 17.1 |
| Quebec | 375,650 | 27.9 | 971,925 | 72.1 |
| Saskatchewan | 183,617 | 73.1 | 67,654 | 26.9 |
| Yukon | 847 | 74.4 | 291 | 25.6 |
| Total civilian vote | 2,670,088 | 63.3 | 1,547,724 | 36.7 |
| Military vote | 251,118 | 80.5 | 60,885 | 19.5 |
| Canada | 2,921,206 | 64.5 | 1,608,609 | 35.5 |

The referendum was held in all 245 electoral districts, which covered all nine provinces and one of the two territories. Residents in the Northwest Territories did not have a vote, as their area was not organized as an electoral district.
