= Jamie Swift =

Canadian journalist, author, and activist

Jamie Swift is a Canadian journalist, author, and activist. His body of work has focused largely on issues of social justice, economy, environment, globalization, and politics.

Swift was born in Montreal, Quebec where, in 1968, he pursued a degree in African Studies at McGill University. Upon moving to Toronto in the mid-seventies, Swift became involved in the social activist community and subsequently began his writing career. In 1977, he published his first book, The Big Nickel: Inco at home and abroad, which examined the effect of nickel production in third world countries.

Over the course of his career, Swift has been published in numerous journals and newspapers, including The Globe and Mail, The Montreal Gazette, The Kingston Whig Standard, and Briarpatch. Throughout the 1990s, he was a regular contributor on CBC's radio series Ideas. Most recently, Swift has co-written a book with noted Canadian historian Ian McKay entitled Warrior Nation: Rebranding Canada in an Age of Anxiety, released in May 2012. He currently lectures at the Queen's School of Business in Kingston, Ontario.

== Awards ==
In 1996, Swift was awarded the Michener-Deacon Fellowship for Public Service Journalism. He received the award from Governor General Roméo LeBlanc in a ceremony on May 6, 1996 at Rideau Hall in Ottawa. R

== Selected works ==
The Big Nickel: Inco at Home and Abroad (1977) ISBN 978-0919946057
Cut and Run: The Assault on Canada's Forests (1983) ISBN 978-0919946316
Conflicts of Interest: Canada and the Third World (1991) ISBN 978-0921284413
Wheel of Fortune: Work and Life in the Age of Falling Expectations (1995) ISBN 978-0921284895
Civil Society in Question (1999) ISBN 978-1896357249
Getting Started on Social Analysis in Canada, Fourth Edition (2003) ISBN 9781896357775
Walking the Union Walk: Stories from the Communications, Energy, and Paperworkers Union (2003) ISBN 978-1896357744
Hydro: The Decline and Fall of Ontario's Electric Empire (2004) ISBN 978-1-896357-88-1
Persistent Poverty: Voices from the Margins (2010) ISBN 978-1-897071-73-1
Warrior Nation: Rebranding Canada in an Age of Anxiety (2012) ISBN 978-1-926662-77-0
