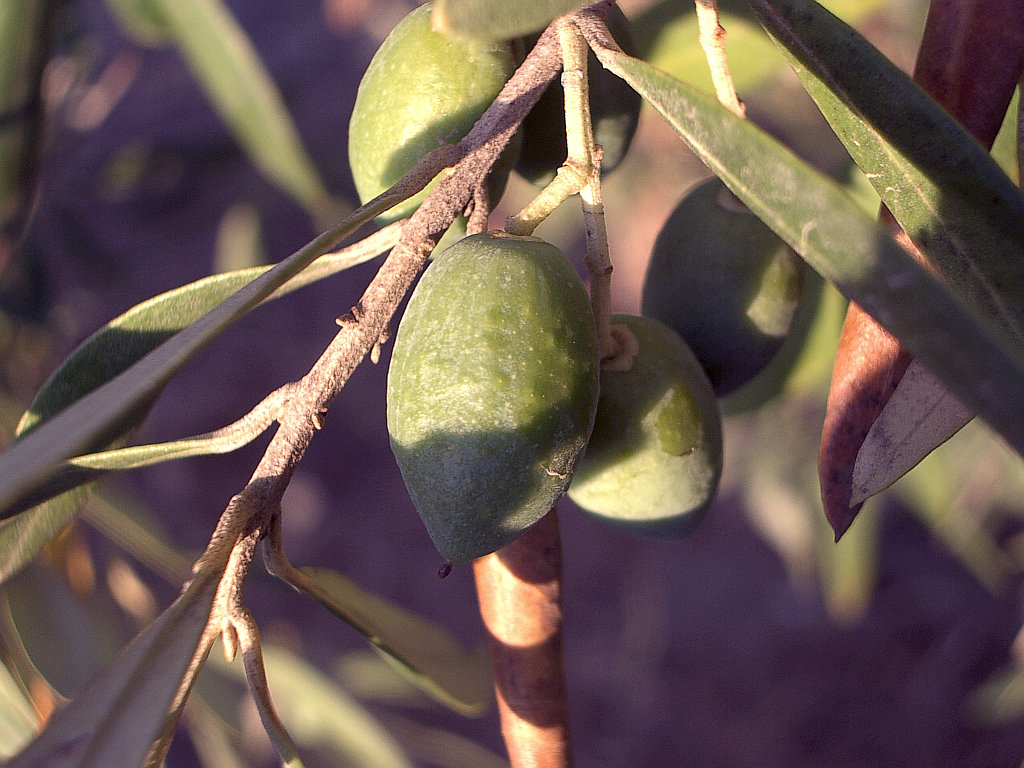
- Olea europaea (Olive), Lisbon, Portugal

Scientific classification
- Kingdom: Plantae
- Clade: Embryophytes
- Clade: Tracheophytes
- Clade: Angiosperms
- Clade: Eudicots
- Clade: Asterids
- Order: Lamiales
- Family: Oleaceae
- Tribe: Oleeae
- Subtribe: Oleinae
- Genus: Olea; L. (1753)

Synonyms
- Enaimon Raf. (1838); Leuranthus Knobl. (1934); Steganthus Knobl. (1934); Stereoderma Blume (1828)

= Olea =

Genus of flowering plants

Olea (/ˈoʊliə/ OH-lee-ə) is a genus of flowering plants in the family Oleaceae. It includes 11 species accepted by Plants of the World Online native to warm temperate and tropical regions of the Middle East, southern Europe, Africa, southern Asia, and Australasia. They are evergreen trees and shrubs, with small, opposite, entire leaves. The fruit is a drupe. Leaves of Olea contain trichosclereids.

For humans, the most important and familiar species is by far the olive (Olea europaea), native to the Mediterranean region, Africa, southwest Asia, and the Himalayas, which is the type species of the genus. The native olive (O. paniculata) is a larger tree, attaining a height of 15–18 m in the forests of Queensland, and yielding a hard and tough timber. The yet harder wood of the black ironwood O. capensis, an inhabitant of Natal, is important in South Africa.

Olea species are used as food plants by the larvae of some Lepidoptera species including double-striped pug.

== Species ==
11 species are currently accepted:

- Olea capensis L. – Small Ironwood – Comoros, Madagascar; Africa from South Africa north to Ethiopia, Sudan, Democratic Republic of the Congo, Nigeria, Ivory Coast, etc.
- Olea capitellata Ridl. – Pahang
- Olea chimanimani Kupicha – Chimanimani Mountains of Mozambique and Zimbabwe
- Olea europaea L. – Olive – Mediterranean, Africa, southwestern Asia, Himalayas; naturalized many other places
- Olea exasperata Jacq. – South Africa
- Olea lancea Lam. – Madagascar, Mauritius, Réunion, Rodrigues Island
- Olea paniculata R.Br. – Yunnan, India, Indochina, Indonesia, Kashmir, Malaysia, Nepal, New Guinea, Pakistan, Sri Lanka, Australia, New Caledonia, Vanuatu
- Olea puberula Ridl. – Peninsular Malaysia
- Olea schliebenii Knobl. – Tanzania
- Olea welwitschii (Knobl.) Gilg & G.Schellenb. – central and eastern Africa from Ethiopia to Zimbabwe
- Olea woodiana Knobl. – South Africa, Eswatini, Kenya, Tanzania

=== Formerly placed here ===
- Chionanthus foveolatus (E.Mey.) Stearn (as O. foveolata E.Mey.)
- Ligustrum compactum var. compactum (as O. compacta Wall. ex G.Don)
- Nestegis cunninghamii (Hook.f.) L.A.S.Johnson (as O. cunninghamii Hook.f.)
- Noronhia emarginata (Lam.) Thouars (as O. emarginata Lam.)
- Osmanthus americanus (L.) Benth. & Hook.f. ex A.Gray (as O. americana L.)
- Osmanthus heterophyllus (G. Don) P.S.Green (as O. aquifolium Siebold & Zucc. or O. ilicifolia Siebold ex Hassk.)
- Tetrapilus borneensis (Boerl.) de Juana (as Olea borneensis Boerl. and Olea gitingensis (Elmer) Kiew)
- Tetrapilus brachiatus Lour. (as Olea brachiata (Lour.) Merr.)
- Tetrapilus javanicus Lour. (as Olea javanica (Blume) Knobl.)
- Tetrapilus moluccensis (Kiew) de Juana (as Olea moluccensis Kiew)
- Tetrapilus obovatus (Merr.) de Juana (as Olea luzonica (Kiew))
- Tetrapilus rubrovenius (Elmer) L.A.S.Johnson (as Olea rubrovenia (Elmer) Kiew)
- Tetrapilus tsoongii (Merr.) de Juana (as Olea tsoongii (Merr.) P.S.Green and Olea yuennanensis Hand.-Mazz.)

== Description ==
Plants in Olea are evergreen trees and shrubs that can live for over 1,000 years. They have simple leaves with short petioles, and their flowers are typically bisexual. While they can adapt to many environmental conditions, they thrive in arid climate. Olea leaves have trichomes on the underside, which protect the plants in dry conditions by reducing water loss and provide UV-B protection. The cultivated olive, Olea europaea, was first domesticated in the Levant around 6,000 years ago, and today there are over 2,000 cultivars in the Mediterranean basin alone.

== Taxonomy ==
Historically, Olea was organized into 3 subgenera: Olea, Tetrapilus, and Paniculatae. Subgenus Olea was then split into two sections, Olea and Ligustroides. Section Olea comprising the "olive complex" of Olea europaea, containing 6 subspecies, including both the domesticated olive and wild relatives. The olive complex is distributed from China to South Africa, across the Mediterranean basin, and the Canary Islands. Ligustroides contains 8 species that are found across central and southern Africa. Subgenus Paniculatae includes only one species, O. paniculata from southwestern China through Asia to Australia. Tetrapilus was the most basal subgenus, and included 23 species in southeast Asia.

Prior to the advent of DNA analysis, subgenus Tetrapilus was proposed as a separate genus that was more closely related to Chionanthus based on pollen morphology, the length of the corolla tube, and flavonoid composition. However, Tetrapilus was later reclassified as a subgenus of Olea due to insufficient molecular evidence supporting it as a genus. More recent phylogenomic evidence has demonstrated that Tetrapilus may be a separate genus that is sister to Chionanthus and Chengiodendron. As such, Olea is not a monophyletic group, however monophyly of a group consisting of only subgenera Olea and Paniculatae is supported.
