= Chionanthus pluriflorus =

Conservation status
- Least Concern (IUCN 3.1)

Scientific classification
- Kingdom: Plantae
- Clade: Embryophytes
- Clade: Tracheophytes
- Clade: Spermatophytes
- Clade: Angiosperms
- Clade: Eudicots
- Clade: Asterids
- Order: Lamiales
- Family: Oleaceae
- Genus: Chionanthus
- Species: C. pluriflorus

Binomial name
- Chionanthus pluriflorus (Knobl.) Kiew

Synonyms
- Linociera pluriflora Knobl.; Linociera verruculosa Merr.

Species of tree

Chionanthus pluriflorus is a tree in the family Oleaceae. The specific epithet pluriflorus means 'many-flowered'.

== Description ==
Chionanthus pluriflorus grows as a tree up to 60 metres (200 ft) tall, with a trunk diameter of up to 60 cm (24 in). Its bark is greenish. The flowers are yellow or yellowish green. The fruit is green, ellipsoid, up to 2.6 cm (1 in) long.

== Distribution and habitat ==
Chionanthus pluriflorus is endemic to Borneo. Its habitat is mixed dipterocarp forest, often by rivers or in swamps, to 1,500 m (5,000 ft) altitude.
