= Chionanthus callophyllus =

Scientific classification
- Kingdom: Plantae
- Clade: Tracheophytes
- Clade: Angiosperms
- Clade: Eudicots
- Clade: Asterids
- Order: Lamiales
- Family: Oleaceae
- Genus: Chionanthus
- Species: C. callophyllus

Binomial name
- Chionanthus callophyllus Blume

Synonyms
- Chionanthus platycarpus (King & Gamble) Kiew; Linociera callophylla (Blume) Knobl.; Linociera paludusa King & Gamble; Mayepea callophylla (Blume) Kuntze; Olea platycarpa King & Gamble

Species of tree

Chionanthus callophyllus grows as a tree up to 30 metres (100 ft) tall, with a trunk diameter of up to 30 centimetres (12 in). The bark is white, grey or brown. The flowers are pale green or white. Fruit is purple and round, up to 2.5 centimetres (1 in) in diameter. The specific epithet callophyllus is from the Greek meaning 'beautiful leaf'. Habitat is lowland forest, sometimes in swamps, from sea-level to 500 metres (1,600 ft) altitude. C. callophyllus is found in Thailand, Malaysia and Indonesia (Borneo and Sumatra).
