= Tenompok Forest Reserve =

Forest reserve in Sabah, Malaysia

- IUCN category Ia (strict nature reserve)
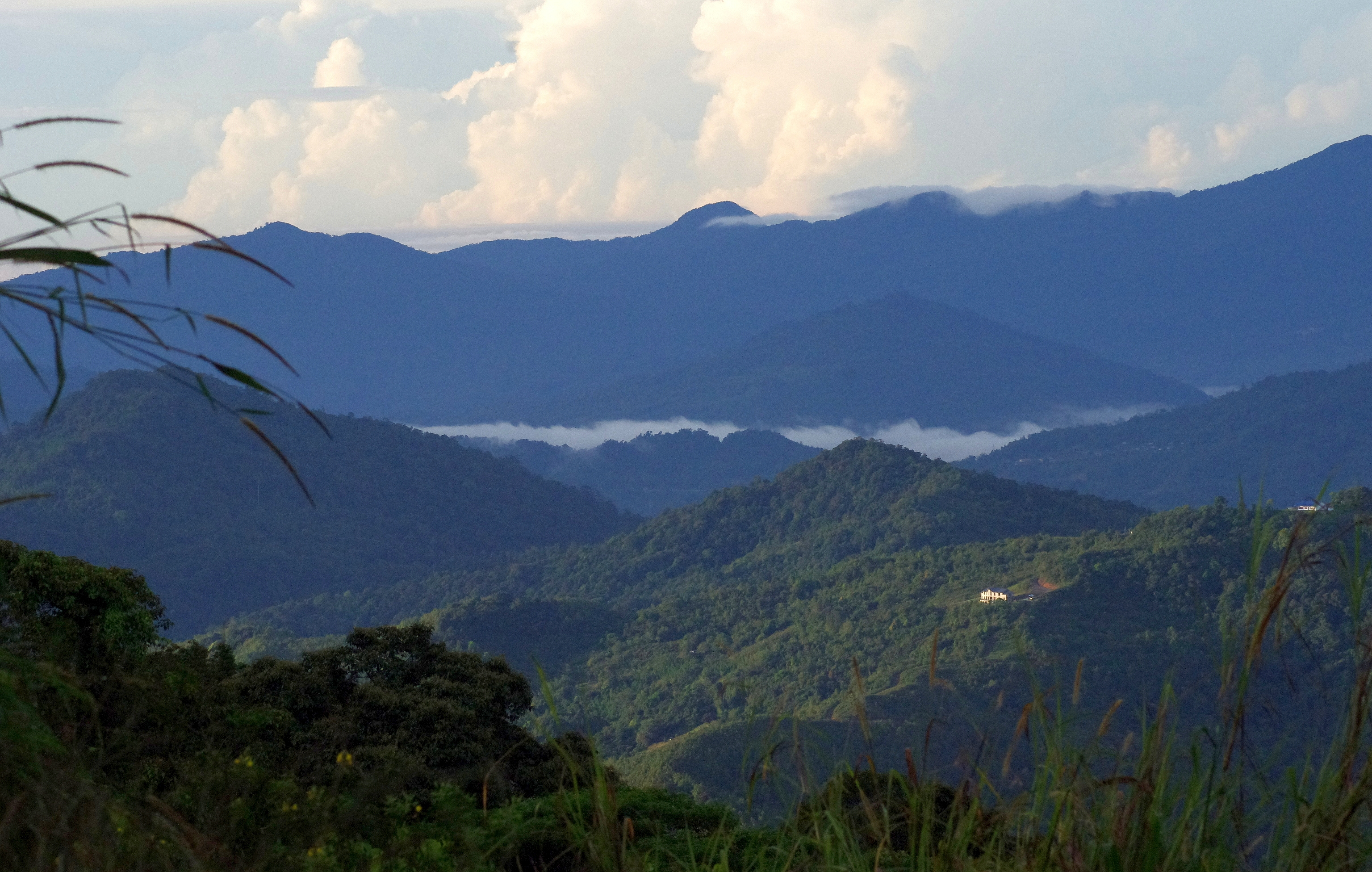
- Forests in the area of Kinabalu Park, Tenompok Forest Reserve and Crocker Range National Park

- Location within Borneo
- Location: Sabah, Malaysia
- Nearest city: Kundasang, Ranau District
- Coordinates: 5°58′07″N 116°30′39″E
- Area: 19.84 km^{2} (7.66 sq mi)
- Established: 1984
- Governing body: Sabah Forestry Department

Tenompok Forest Reserve is a protected forest reserve in Ranau District of West Coast Division, Sabah, Malaysia. It was designated as a Class 1 Forest Reserve by the Sabah Forestry Department in 1984. Its area is 1,984 hectares (19.84 km^{2}). A former reserve, the Kampung Bundu Tuhan Native Residence Reserve, occupied what is now the eastern portion of Tenompok. The reserve is mountainous, reaching 1,660 metres (5,450 ft) above sea level. Vegetation consists of lower montane forest and montane kerangas forest. Both share a similar species composition, although trees in montane keranga forests are smaller. The reserve's Tomis River is a tributary of the Tuaran River. The area of the reserve has never received significant logging, aside from small amount near what are now its borders. This small logging is thought to be carried out by nearby villages for local use. There is also some agricultural encroachment. The reserve lies between Kinabalu Park and Crocker Range National Park. One farmer has a house within the reserve. There are several settlements around the reserve, along with agricultural land.

== Flora ==
Most of the reserve consists of lower montane old-growth forest, of which the most dominant tree family is Fagaceae. 70% of the reserve's forests are considered in good condition due to having an intact canopy. There is some secondary forest near the edges. Tenompok Forest Reserve is an important area for tree species such as Syzygium species including Syzygium clavatum, Xanthophyllum species including Xanthophyllum affine, Lithocarpus species including Lithocarpus havilandii, Canarium species, Litsea species, Palaquium gutta, Adinandra clemensiae, Lophopetalum beccarianum, Timonius flavescens, Garcinia parvifolia, Schima wallichii, Planchonella malaccensis, and Artocarpus dadah. The tree species Chionanthus kinabaluensis was assessed as Vulnerable by the IUCN in 2020 due to its only being found in Tenompok.

The reserve supports 68 identified species of lycophytes and ferns. Three (Angiopteris ferox, Mesophlebion dulitense, and Selaginella brevipes) are endemic to the local area surrounding Mount Kinabalu, while a further three (Lindsaea crispa, Pronephrium firmulum, and Sphaerostephanos baramensis) are endemic to Borneo.

== Fauna ==
Tenompok Forest Reserve is home to animals including barking deer, gibbon and other primate species. The reserve hosts a number of Bornean endemic insects. 19 endemic moth species, including Asota kinabaluensis and Auriculoceryx pterodactyliformis, have been surveyed. An endemic beetle species, Odontolabis leuthneri, has also been recorded in Tenompok.
