= Chionanthus macrocarpus =

Scientific classification
- Kingdom: Plantae
- Clade: Tracheophytes
- Clade: Angiosperms
- Clade: Eudicots
- Clade: Asterids
- Order: Lamiales
- Family: Oleaceae
- Genus: Chionanthus
- Species: C. macrocarpus

Binomial name
- Chionanthus macrocarpus Blume

Synonyms
- Chionanthus elaeocarpus (Stapf) Kiew; Chionanthus insignis Miq.; Linociera elaeocarpa Stapf; Linociera insignis (Miq.) C.B.Clarke; Linociera macrocarpa (Blume) Knobl.; Mayepea insignis (Miq.) Kuntze

Species of tree

Chionanthus macrocarpus grows as a tree up to 30 metres (98 ft) tall, with a trunk diameter of up to 60 centimetres (24 in). The flowers are white. Fruit is bluish green when fresh, ellipsoid, up to 4.5 centimetres (1.8 in) long. The specific epithet macrocarpus is from the Greek meaning 'large fruit'. Habitat is mixed dipterocarp forest from sea-level to 1,700 metres (5,600 ft) altitude. C. macrocarpus is found in Sumatra, Peninsular Malaysia, Borneo and Java.
