= Chionanthus spicatus =

Scientific classification
- Kingdom: Plantae
- Clade: Tracheophytes
- Clade: Angiosperms
- Clade: Eudicots
- Clade: Asterids
- Order: Lamiales
- Family: Oleaceae
- Genus: Chionanthus
- Species: C. spicatus

Binomial name
- Chionanthus spicatus Blume

Synonyms
- Linociera spicata (Blume) Knobl.; Mayepea spicata (Blume) Kuntze

Species of tree

Chionanthus spicatus grows as a tree up to 17 metres (60 ft) tall, with a trunk diameter of up to 20 centimetres (8 in). The bark is greyish. The fragrant flowers are yellowish green or creamy white. Its fruit is purple-black and round. The specific epithet spicatus (Latin 'spiked') refers to its inflorescence. Habitat is forests from sea-level to 1,500 metres (5,000 ft) altitude. C. spicatus is found in Borneo and the Philippines.
