= Chionanthus pubicalyx =

Scientific classification
- Kingdom: Plantae
- Clade: Tracheophytes
- Clade: Angiosperms
- Clade: Eudicots
- Clade: Asterids
- Order: Lamiales
- Family: Oleaceae
- Genus: Chionanthus
- Species: C. pubicalyx

Binomial name
- Chionanthus pubicalyx (Ridl.) Kiew

Synonyms
- Linociera pubicalyx Ridl.

Species of tree

Chionanthus pubicalyx grows as a tree up to 40 metres (130 ft) tall, with a trunk diameter of up to 30 centimetres (12 in). The bark is whitish or grey. The fragrant flowers are white or pale yellow. Fruit is purple, ovoid, up to 2 centimetres (1 in) long. Habitat is forests from sea level to 1,600 metres (5,000 ft) altitude. C. pubicalyx is endemic to Borneo.
