= Chionanthus globosus =

Scientific classification
- Kingdom: Plantae
- Clade: Tracheophytes
- Clade: Angiosperms
- Clade: Eudicots
- Clade: Asterids
- Order: Lamiales
- Family: Oleaceae
- Genus: Chionanthus
- Species: C. globosus

Binomial name
- Chionanthus globosus (Kiew) Kiew

Synonyms
- Chionanthus elaeocarpus var. globosus Kiew

Species of tree

Chionanthus globosus grows as a tree up to 42 metres (138 ft) tall, with a trunk diameter of up to 60 centimetres (24 in). The flowers are white. The fruit is green turning black, round, up to 2.5 centimetres (0.98 in) long. The specific epithet globosus is from the Latin meaning 'spherical', referring to the fruit. Its habitat is forest from 200 metres (660 ft) to 1,300 metres (4,300 ft) altitude. The species is endemic to Malaysian Borneo (Sabah and Sarawak).
