= Chionanthus sabahensis =

Conservation status
- Least Concern (IUCN 3.1)

Scientific classification
- Kingdom: Plantae
- Clade: Tracheophytes
- Clade: Angiosperms
- Clade: Eudicots
- Clade: Asterids
- Order: Lamiales
- Family: Oleaceae
- Genus: Chionanthus
- Species: C. sabahensis

Binomial name
- Chionanthus sabahensis Kiew

Species of flowering plant

Chionanthus sabahensis is a flowering plant in the family Oleaceae. It is native to Borneo.

== Description ==
Chionanthus sabahensis grows as a tree up to 13 m (40 ft) tall, with a trunk diameter of up to 10 cm (4 in). The bark is green. The flowers are greenish white.

== Distribution and habitat ==
Chionanthus sabahensis is endemic to Borneo where it is confined to Sabah. Its habitat is montane forest from 1,350–2,200 metres (4,400–7,200 ft) elevation.
