= Chionanthus plurifloroides =

Scientific classification
- Kingdom: Plantae
- Clade: Tracheophytes
- Clade: Angiosperms
- Clade: Eudicots
- Clade: Asterids
- Order: Lamiales
- Family: Oleaceae
- Genus: Chionanthus
- Species: C. plurifloroides

Binomial name
- Chionanthus plurifloroides Kiew

Species of tree

Chionanthus plurifloroides grows as a tree up to 17 metres (60 ft) tall, with a trunk diameter of up to 30 centimetres (12 in). The bark is yellowish grey or dark brown. The flowers are yellow green. Fruit is blue green, round, up to 1.5 centimetres (1 in) in diameter. Habitat is mixed dipterocarp forest, from sea-level to 600 metres (2,000 ft) altitude. C. plurifloroides is endemic to Borneo.
