= Chionanthus rugosus =

Scientific classification
- Kingdom: Plantae
- Clade: Tracheophytes
- Clade: Angiosperms
- Clade: Eudicots
- Clade: Asterids
- Order: Lamiales
- Family: Oleaceae
- Genus: Chionanthus
- Species: C. rugosus

Binomial name
- Chionanthus rugosus Kiew

Species of tree

Chionanthus rugosus grows as a tree up to 20 metres (70 ft) tall, with a trunk diameter of up to 10 centimetres (4 in). The bark is greyish. The fruit is green, ovoid, and up to 0.7 centimetres (0.3 in) long. The specific epithet rugosus is from the Latin meaning 'rough', referring to the fruit. Its habitat is lowland mixed dipterocarp forest. C. rugosus is endemic to Borneo.
