= Chionanthus porcatus =

Scientific classification
- Kingdom: Plantae
- Clade: Tracheophytes
- Clade: Angiosperms
- Clade: Eudicots
- Clade: Asterids
- Order: Lamiales
- Family: Oleaceae
- Genus: Chionanthus
- Species: C. porcatus

Binomial name
- Chionanthus porcatus Kiew

Species of tree

Chionanthus porcatus grows as a tree up to 30 metres (100 ft) tall, with a trunk diameter of up to 50 centimetres (20 in). The bark is white or dark grey. The flowers are greenish yellow or white. Fruit is black, ellipsoid, up to 6.5 centimetres (3 in) long. The specific epithet porcatus is from the Latin meaning 'ridged', referring to the fruit. Habitat is forests from sea-level to 650 metres (2,000 ft) altitude. C. porcatus is endemic to Borneo.
