= Chionanthus crispus =

Scientific classification
- Kingdom: Plantae
- Clade: Tracheophytes
- Clade: Angiosperms
- Clade: Eudicots
- Clade: Asterids
- Order: Lamiales
- Family: Oleaceae
- Genus: Chionanthus
- Species: C. crispus

Binomial name
- Chionanthus crispus Kiew

Species of tree

Chionanthus crispus grows as a tree up to 30 metres (100 ft) tall, with a trunk diameter of up to 60 centimetres (24 in). The bark is grey. The flowers are white or purple. The specific epithet crispus is from the Latin meaning 'curled', referring to the petals. Habitat is primary forest from sea-level to 850 metres (3,000 ft) altitude. C. crispus is endemic to Borneo.
