= Tetrapilus borneensis =

Scientific classification
- Kingdom: Plantae
- Clade: Tracheophytes
- Clade: Angiosperms
- Clade: Eudicots
- Clade: Asterids
- Order: Lamiales
- Family: Oleaceae
- Genus: Tetrapilus
- Species: T. borneensis

Binomial name
- Tetrapilus borneensis Boerl. de Juana (2020)

Synonyms
- Linociera gitingensis Elmer (1913); Linociera longifolia Merr. (1922); Linociera pallida (Merr.) Merr. (1906), nom. illeg.; Linociera philippinensis Merr. (1909); Mayepea pallida Merr. (1905); Olea borneensis Boerl. (1899); Olea gitingensis (Elmer) Kiew (1999)

Species of tree

Tetrapilus borneensis is a species of flowering plants in the olive family Oleaceae found in Borneo and the Philippines. Its habitat is forests from sea level to 1,650 metres (5,400 ft) elevation.

It grows as a tree up to 25 metres (80 ft) tall, with a trunk diameter of up to 20 centimetres (8 in); the bark is whitish or light grey. It has greyish green leaves with thick petioles. The flowers are white or yellowish-green. Fruit ripens to black.
