= Chionanthus balgooyanus =

Conservation status
- Endangered (IUCN 3.1)

Scientific classification
- Kingdom: Plantae
- Clade: Embryophytes
- Clade: Tracheophytes
- Clade: Angiosperms
- Clade: Eudicots
- Clade: Asterids
- Order: Lamiales
- Family: Oleaceae
- Genus: Chionanthus
- Species: C. balgooyanus

Binomial name
- Chionanthus balgooyanus Kiew

Species of flowering plant

Chionanthus balgooyanus is a tree in the family Oleaceae. It is named for the Dutch botanist Max Michael Josephus van Balgooy.

== Description ==
Chionanthus balgooyanus grows up to 20 m (70 ft) tall, with a trunk diameter of up to 35 cm (14 in). The bark is greyish green or dark brown. The flowers are white or greenish white.

== Distribution and habitat ==
Chionanthus balgooyanus is endemic to Borneo, where it is confined to Sarawak. Its habitat is hill rain forest or lower montane rain forest from 650 m (2,000 ft) to 1,400 m (4,600 ft) elevation.

== Conservation ==
Chionanthus balgooyanus has been assessed as endangered on the IUCN Red List. Three subpopulations are recorded. One subpopulation is being logged, likely for its timber. Another subpopulation is subject to land conversion for agriculture. The subpopulation in Gunung Mulu National Park is afforded a level of protection there.
