= Chionanthus callophylloides =

Conservation status
- Least Concern (IUCN 3.1)

Scientific classification
- Kingdom: Plantae
- Clade: Tracheophytes
- Clade: Angiosperms
- Clade: Eudicots
- Clade: Asterids
- Order: Lamiales
- Family: Oleaceae
- Genus: Chionanthus
- Species: C. callophylloides

Binomial name
- Chionanthus callophylloides Kiew

Species of flowering plant

Chionanthus callophylloides is a flowering plant in the family Oleaceae. It is native to Borneo.

== Description ==
Chionanthus callophylloides grows as a tree up to 13 m (40 ft) tall, with a trunk diameter of up to 25 cm (10 in). The bark is brown. The ellipsoid fruit is blue green, up to 3 cm (1.2 in) long.

== Distribution and habitat ==
Chionanthus callophylloides is endemic to Malaysian Borneo (Sabah and Sarawak). Its habitat is in lowland mixed dipterocarp forest, sometimes in swamps.
