= Chionanthus lucens =

Scientific classification
- Kingdom: Plantae
- Clade: Tracheophytes
- Clade: Angiosperms
- Clade: Eudicots
- Clade: Asterids
- Order: Lamiales
- Family: Oleaceae
- Genus: Chionanthus
- Species: C. lucens

Binomial name
- Chionanthus lucens Kiew

Species of tree

Chionanthus lucens grows as a tree up to 18 metres (60 ft) tall, with a trunk diameter of up to 25 centimetres (10 in). The bark is whitish. The flowers are light green or yellow. Habitat is mixed dipterocarp forest from sea level to 750 metres (2,500 ft) altitude. C. lucens is found in Peninsular Malaysia and Borneo.
