= Chionanthus kinabaluensis =

Conservation status
- Vulnerable (IUCN 3.1)

Scientific classification
- Kingdom: Plantae
- Clade: Tracheophytes
- Clade: Angiosperms
- Clade: Eudicots
- Clade: Asterids
- Order: Lamiales
- Family: Oleaceae
- Genus: Chionanthus
- Species: C. kinabaluensis

Binomial name
- Chionanthus kinabaluensis Kiew

Species of tree

Chionanthus kinabaluensis is a tree in the family Oleaceae.

== Description ==
Chionanthus kinabaluensis grows up to 10 metres (30 ft) tall. It has green fruit, measuring up to 1.5 cm (1 in) long.

== Distribution and habitat ==
Chionanthus kinabaluensis is endemic to Borneo, where it is confined to the Tenompok Forest Reserve on Mount Kinabalu. Its habitat is montane forest, at an altitude of 1,500 m (5,000 ft).
