= Chionanthus palustris =

Scientific classification
- Kingdom: Plantae
- Clade: Tracheophytes
- Clade: Angiosperms
- Clade: Eudicots
- Clade: Asterids
- Order: Lamiales
- Family: Oleaceae
- Genus: Chionanthus
- Species: C. palustris

Binomial name
- Chionanthus palustris Kiew

Synonyms
- None known.

Species of tree

Chionanthus palustris grows as a tree up to 17 metres (60 ft) tall, with a trunk diameter of up to 15 centimetres (6 in). The bark is light brown. The flowers are yellowish green. Fruit is cream coloured, round, up to 2 centimetres (1 in) in diameter. The specific epithet palustris is from the Latin meaning 'swampy', referring to the habitat. Habitat is lowland swamp and forests. C. palustris is endemic to Borneo.

It was first described and published by Ruth Kiew in Malaysian Forester Vol.43 on page 382 in 1980.
