= Chionanthus leopoldii =

Conservation status
- Least Concern (IUCN 3.1)

Scientific classification
- Kingdom: Plantae
- Clade: Tracheophytes
- Clade: Angiosperms
- Clade: Eudicots
- Clade: Asterids
- Order: Lamiales
- Family: Oleaceae
- Genus: Chionanthus
- Species: C. leopoldii

Binomial name
- Chionanthus leopoldii Kiew

Species of tree

Chionanthus leopoldii is a flowering plant in the family Oleaceae. It is native to Borneo.

== Description ==
Chionanthus leopoldii grows as a tree up to 13 m (40 ft) tall, with a trunk diameter of up to 30 cm (12 in). The bark is greyish. The flowers are pale greenish. The fruit is purple or red-brown when ripe, round, up to 1.8 cm (0.7 in) in diameter.

== Distribution and habitat ==
Chionanthus leopoldii is endemic to Borneo, where it is confined to Sabah. Its habitat is mixed dipterocarp forests from 100–700 m (300–2,300 ft) altitude.
