= Chionanthus polycephalus =

Conservation status
- Endangered (IUCN 3.1)

Scientific classification
- Kingdom: Plantae
- Clade: Embryophytes
- Clade: Tracheophytes
- Clade: Spermatophytes
- Clade: Angiosperms
- Clade: Eudicots
- Clade: Asterids
- Order: Lamiales
- Family: Oleaceae
- Genus: Chionanthus
- Species: C. polycephalus

Binomial name
- Chionanthus polycephalus Kiew

Species of tree

Chionanthus polycephalus is a tree in the family Oleaceae. The specific epithet polycephalus means 'many-headed', referring to the inflorescence.

== Description ==
Chionanthus polycephalus grows as a tree up to 25 metres (80 ft) tall, with a trunk diameter of up to 25 cm (10 in). Its bark is dark grey. The flowers are creamy white. The fruit is yellowish, ovoid, up to 2.5 cm (1 in) long.

== Distribution and habitat ==
Chionanthus polycephalus is endemic to Borneo, where it is confined to Sarawak. Its habitat is limestone and hill forest, at altitudes of 120–600 m (400–2,000 ft). This habitat is at risk from clearing for agriculture.
