= Chionanthus evenius =

Scientific classification
- Kingdom: Plantae
- Clade: Tracheophytes
- Clade: Angiosperms
- Clade: Eudicots
- Clade: Asterids
- Order: Lamiales
- Family: Oleaceae
- Genus: Chionanthus
- Species: C. evenius

Binomial name
- Chionanthus evenius (Stapf) Kiew

Synonyms
- Linociera evenia Stapf

Species of tree

Chionanthus evenius grows as a tree up to 50 metres (160 ft) tall, with a trunk diameter of up to 30 centimetres (12 in). The bark is grey. The flowers are pinkish white. Habitat is generally lowland swamp forest but sometimes found on higher ground, up to 1,400 metres (4,600 ft) altitude. C. evenius is found in Sumatra, Peninsular Malaysia and Borneo.
