= Chionanthus polygamus =

Conservation status
- Least Concern (IUCN 3.1)

Scientific classification
- Kingdom: Plantae
- Clade: Embryophytes
- Clade: Tracheophytes
- Clade: Spermatophytes
- Clade: Angiosperms
- Clade: Eudicots
- Clade: Asterids
- Order: Lamiales
- Family: Oleaceae
- Genus: Chionanthus
- Species: C. polygamus

Binomial name
- Chionanthus polygamus (Roxb.) Kiew

Synonyms
- Chionanthus laxiflorus Blume; Linociera laxiflora (Blume) C.B.Clarke; Linociera oxycarpa Lingelsh.; Linociera polygama (Roxb.) S.Moore; Mayepea laxiflora (Blume) Kuntze

Species of tree

Chionanthus polygamus is a tree in the family Oleaceae. The specific epithet polygamus refers to the tree having both unisexual and bisexual flowers.

== Description ==
Chionanthus polygamus grows as a tree up to 30 metres (100 ft) tall, with a trunk diameter of up to 40 cm (16 in). Its bark is grey. The flowers are yellow green or creamy white.

== Distribution and habitat ==
Chionanthus polygamus is native to an area from Sumatra east to New Guinea. Its habitat is forests to 1,400 m (4,600 ft) altitude.
