= Chionanthus pachyphyllus =

Scientific classification
- Kingdom: Plantae
- Clade: Tracheophytes
- Clade: Angiosperms
- Clade: Eudicots
- Clade: Asterids
- Order: Lamiales
- Family: Oleaceae
- Genus: Chionanthus
- Species: C. pachyphyllus

Binomial name
- Chionanthus pachyphyllus (Merr.) Kiew

Synonyms
- Linociera pachyphylla Merr.

Species of tree

Chionanthus pachyphyllus grows as a tree up to 22 metres (70 ft) tall, with a trunk diameter of up to 20 centimetres (8 in). The bark is light brown. The flowers are yellow. The specific epithet pachyphyllus is from the Greek meaning 'thick leaf'. Habitat is forests from sea level to 1,500 metres (5,000 ft) altitude. C. pachyphyllus is endemic to Borneo.
