= George Darby Haviland =

British surgeon and naturalist

George Darby Haviland (1857–1901) was a British surgeon and naturalist. He was born at Warbleton, Sussex in England. He served as Director of the Raffles Museum in Singapore as well as being a medical officer in Sarawak and Curator of the Sarawak Museum in Kuching from 1891 to 1893. In 1895 he returned to England and worked at the Kew Herbarium in London before going to South Africa where he died in Natal.

== Plant species ==
Some plant species named for Haviland:

- Alangium havilandii
- Alsophila havilandii
- Barringtonia havilandii
- Chionanthus havilandii
- Diospyros havilandii
- Ilex havilandii
- Lithocarpus havilandii
- Shorea havilandii
- Vatica havilandii
- Voacanga havilandii
- Xanthophyllum havilandii

His zoological author abbreviation is Haviland.
