= Chionanthus curvicarpus =

Scientific classification
- Kingdom: Plantae
- Clade: Tracheophytes
- Clade: Angiosperms
- Clade: Eudicots
- Clade: Asterids
- Order: Lamiales
- Family: Oleaceae
- Genus: Chionanthus
- Species: C. curvicarpus

Binomial name
- Chionanthus curvicarpus Kiew

Species of tree

Chionanthus curvicarpus grows as a tree up to 23 metres (80 ft) tall, with a trunk diameter of up to 30 centimetres (12 in). The bark is whitish grey or brown. The flowers are yellowish, sometimes greenish white. Fruit is green, ellipsoid, up to 2.5 centimetres (1 in) long. The specific epithet curvicarpus is from the Latin and Greek meaning 'curved fruit'. Habitat is forest from sea-level to 1,000 metres (3,300 ft) altitude. C. curvicarpus is found in Sumatra, Peninsular Malaysia and Borneo.
