= Auriculoceryx kannegieteri =

Scientific classification
- Domain: Eukaryota
- Kingdom: Animalia
- Phylum: Arthropoda
- Class: Insecta
- Order: Lepidoptera
- Superfamily: Noctuoidea
- Family: Erebidae
- Subfamily: Arctiinae
- Genus: Auriculoceryx
- Species: A. kannegieteri

Binomial name
- Auriculoceryx kannegieteri (Rothschild, 1910)

Synonyms
- Trichaeta kannegieteri Rothschild, 1910

Species of moth

Auriculoceryx kannegieteri is a moth of the family Erebidae. It was described by Walter Rothschild in 1910. It is found on Nias, an island off the western coast of Sumatra, Indonesia.
