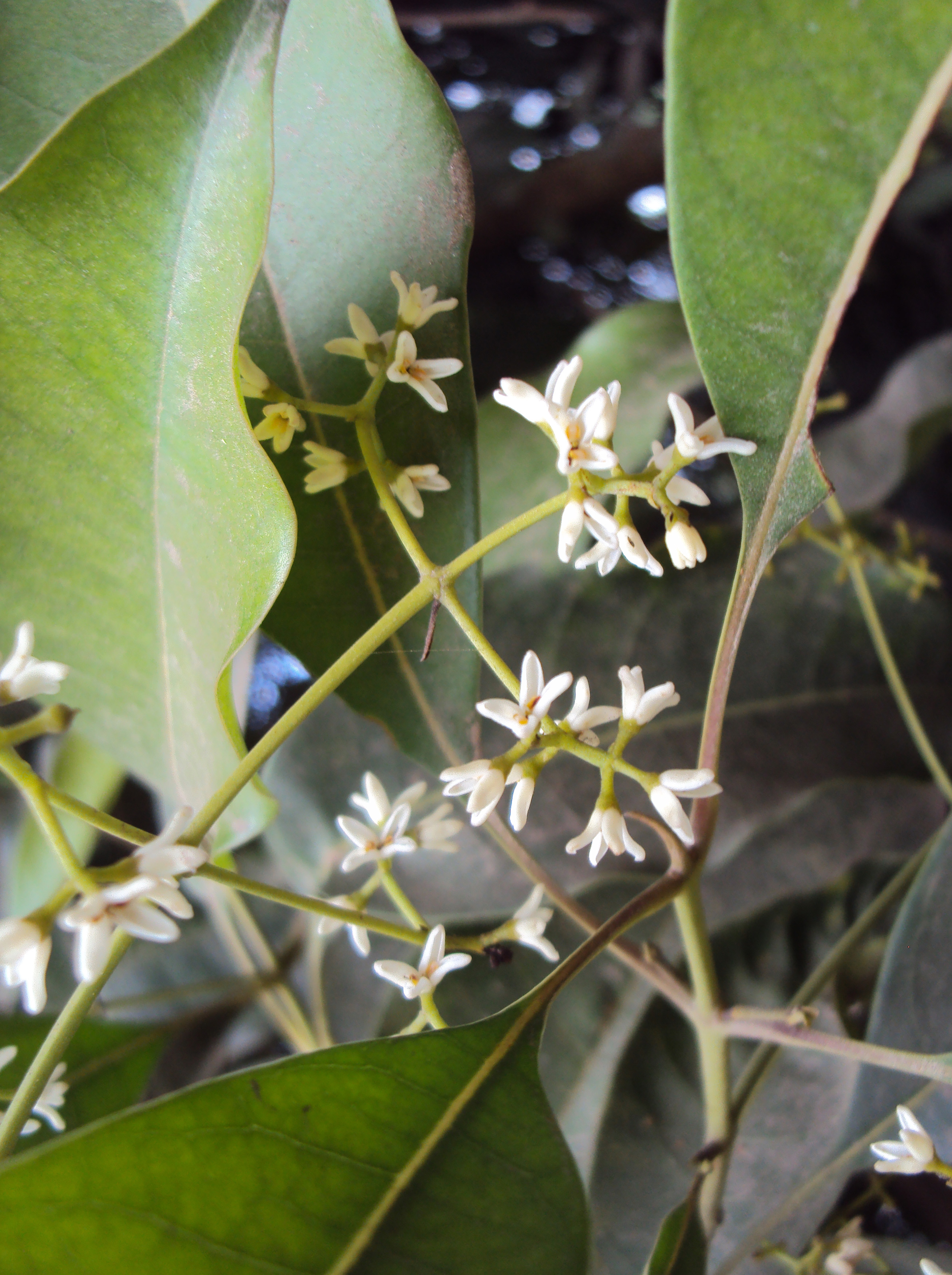
- Flowers and leaves

Conservation status
- Least Concern (IUCN 3.1)

Scientific classification
- Kingdom: Plantae
- Clade: Embryophytes
- Clade: Tracheophytes
- Clade: Spermatophytes
- Clade: Angiosperms
- Clade: Eudicots
- Clade: Asterids
- Order: Lamiales
- Family: Oleaceae
- Genus: Chionanthus
- Species: C. ramiflorus

Binomial name
- Chionanthus ramiflorus Roxb.

Synonyms
- 44 synonyms: Linociera ramiflora (Roxb.) Wall.; Mayepea ramiflora (Roxb.) F.Muell.; Chionanthus effusiflorus F.Muell.; Chionanthus intermedius (Wight) F.Muell.; Chionanthus macrophyllus (Wall. ex G.Don) Blume; Chionanthus macrophyllus var. attenuatus (Wall. ex G.Don) K.K.N.Nair & K.P.Janardh.; Chionanthus palembanicus Miq.; Chionanthus paniculatus (Roxb.) K.K.N.Nair & K.P.Janardh.; Chionanthus paniculatus var. roxburghii (Spreng.) K.K.N.Nair & K.P.Janardh.; Chionanthus pauciflorus (Wall. ex G.Don) Bennet & Raizada; Chionanthus pauciflorus var. evolutior (C.B.Clarke) K.K.N.Nair & K.P.Janardh.; Chionanthus pauciflorus var. palembanicus (Miq.) Bennet & Raizada; Chionanthus picrophloius F.Muell.; Chionanthus ramiflorus var. grandiflorus B.M.Miao; Chionanthus ramiflorus var. palembanicus (Miq.) P.Daniel; Chionanthus ramiflorus var. peninsularis K.Ravik. & Lakshm.; Chionanthus roxburghii (Spreng.) S.K.Srivast. & S.L.Kapoor; Chionanthus roxburghii var. intermedius (Wight) S.K.Srivast. & S.L.Kapoor; Chionanthus tenuiflorus Wall. ex DC.; Linociera cumingiana S.Vidal; Linociera effusiflora F.Muell.; Linociera intermedia Wight; Linociera intermedia var. roxburghii (Spreng.) C.B.Clarke; Linociera macrophylla Wall. ex G.Don; Linociera macrophylla var. attenuata (Wall. ex G.Don) C.B.Clarke; Linociera oblonga Wall. ex G.Don; Linociera pauciflora (Wall. ex G.Don) C.B.Clarke; Linociera pauciflora var. evolutior C.B.Clarke; Linociera pauciflora var. palembanica (Miq.) C.B.Clarke; Linociera picrophloia (F.Muell.) F.M.Bailey; Linociera ramiflora var. grandiflora (B.M.Miao) B.M.Miao; Linociera ramiflora f. pubisepala L.C.Chia; Mayepea cumingiana (S.Vidal) Merr.; Mayepea intermedia (Wight) Kuntze; Mayepea palembanica (Miq.) Kuntze; Mayepea pauciflora (Wall. ex G.Don) Kuntze; Mayepea picrophloia (F.Muell.) F.Muell.; Olea attenuata Wall. ex G.Don; Olea floribunda Benth.; Olea paniculata Roxb.; Olea pauciflora Wall. ex G.Don; Olea roxburghiana Schult.; Olea roxburghii Spreng.; Phillyrea ramiflora Roxb. ex C.B.Clarke

= Chionanthus ramiflorus =

Species of plant

Chionanthus ramiflorus, commonly known in Australia as northern olive or native olive, is a species of plant in the olive family Oleaceae. It is native to the regions from India and Nepal, through southern China and South East Asia to the Australian state of Queensland.

== Description ==
Chionanthus ramiflorus is an evergreen shrub or tree that can reach up to 23 m (75 ft) in height. The trunk and branches are pale, the leafy twigs are circular in cross section. The glossy green leaves are usually about 8 to 20 cm (3.1 to 7.9 in) long and 4 to 7 cm (1.6 to 2.8 in) wide, and elliptic to oblong-elliptic. They are attached to the twig with a petiole up to 5 cm (2.0 in) long and they have 7–10 lateral veins on either side of the midrib.

The inflorescence is a panicle up to 12 cm (4.7 in) long. They carry numerous small white or yellow flowers, each of which have four petals about 2.5 mm (0.10 in) long. The fruit is a blue-black, ovoid drupe about 25 mm (1.0 in) long and 15 mm (0.6 in) diameter.

== Distribution and habitat ==
It is native to the following regions as defined in the World Geographical Scheme for Recording Plant Distributions:

- China: South-Central, China Southeast, Hainan
- Eastern Asia: Taiwan
- Indian Subcontinent: Assam, Bangladesh, East Himalaya, India, Nepal, Sri Lanka, West Himalaya
- Indo-China: Andaman Islands, Cambodia, Laos, Myanmar, Nicobar Islands, Thailand, Vietnam
- Malesia: Borneo, Lesser Sunda Islands, Malaya, Maluku, Philippines, Sulawesi, Sumatera
- Papuasia: New Guinea, Solomon Islands
- Australia: Queensland

The species grows in evergreen or deciduous forests, such as rainforest, monsoon forest, and littoral forest. In Australia it is recorded at altitudes from sea level up to about 600 m (2,000 ft), up to 1,500 m (4,900 ft) in Thailand and 2,000 m (6,600 ft) in China, while in Nepal it occurs between 400 and 500 m (1,300 and 1,600 ft).

== Taxonomy ==
It was originally described by Scottish botanist William Roxburgh in 1820, but since then numerous authors have put forward many alternate names, resulting in numerous synonyms now being recognised.

== Conservation ==
The International Union for Conservation of Nature (IUCN) assessed this species in 2024, giving it a status of least concern. In its statement, the IUCN cites the plant's large numbers and wide distribution, as well as the absence of any discernable threats, as the basis for its evaluation.

== Ecology ==
The fruit of this plant is eaten by cassowaries, figbirds, koels, Torres Strait pigeons, and golden bowerbirds. The leaves are eaten by Lumholtz's tree-kangaroos.

== Gallery ==
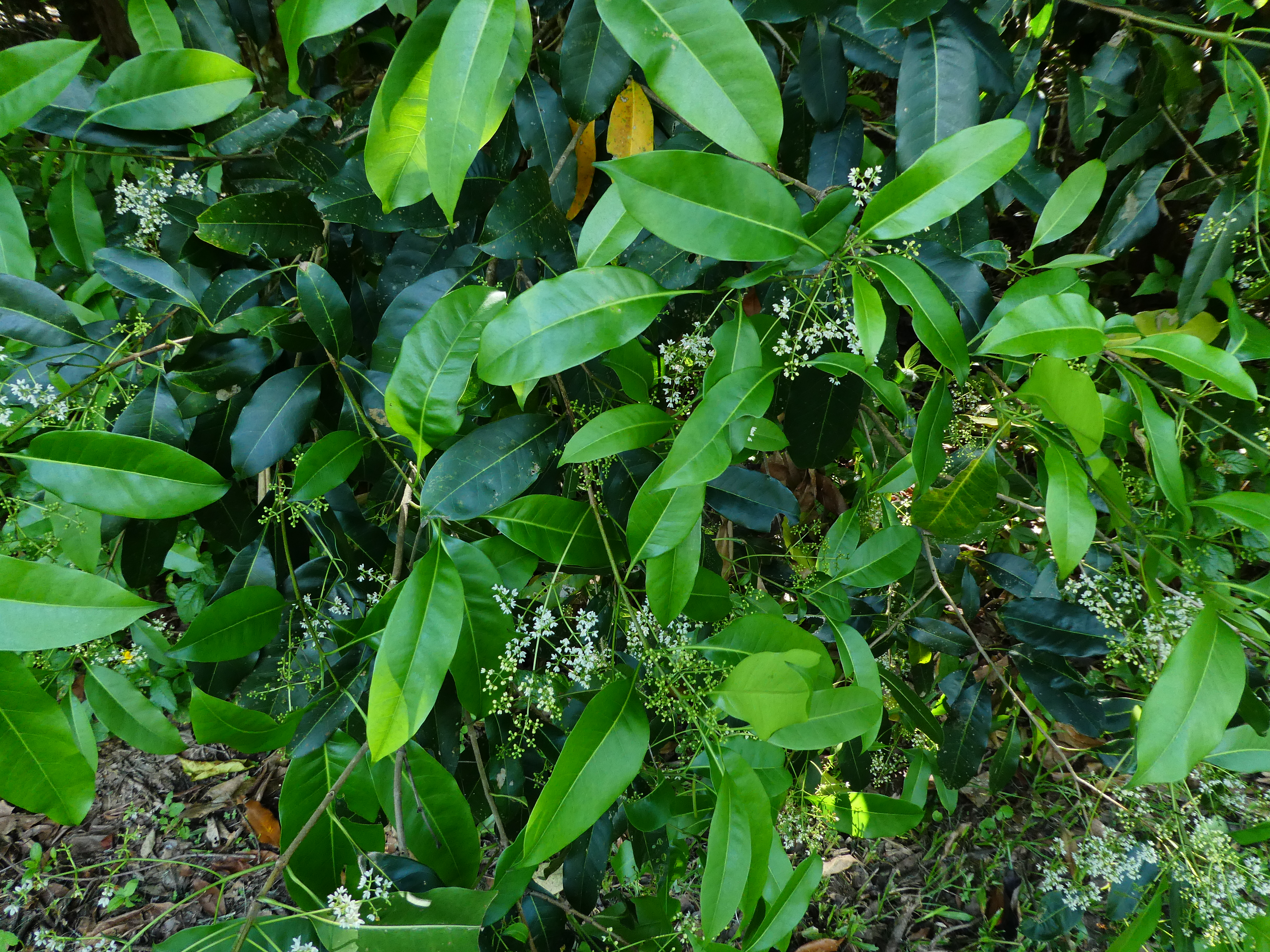
Flowers and buds

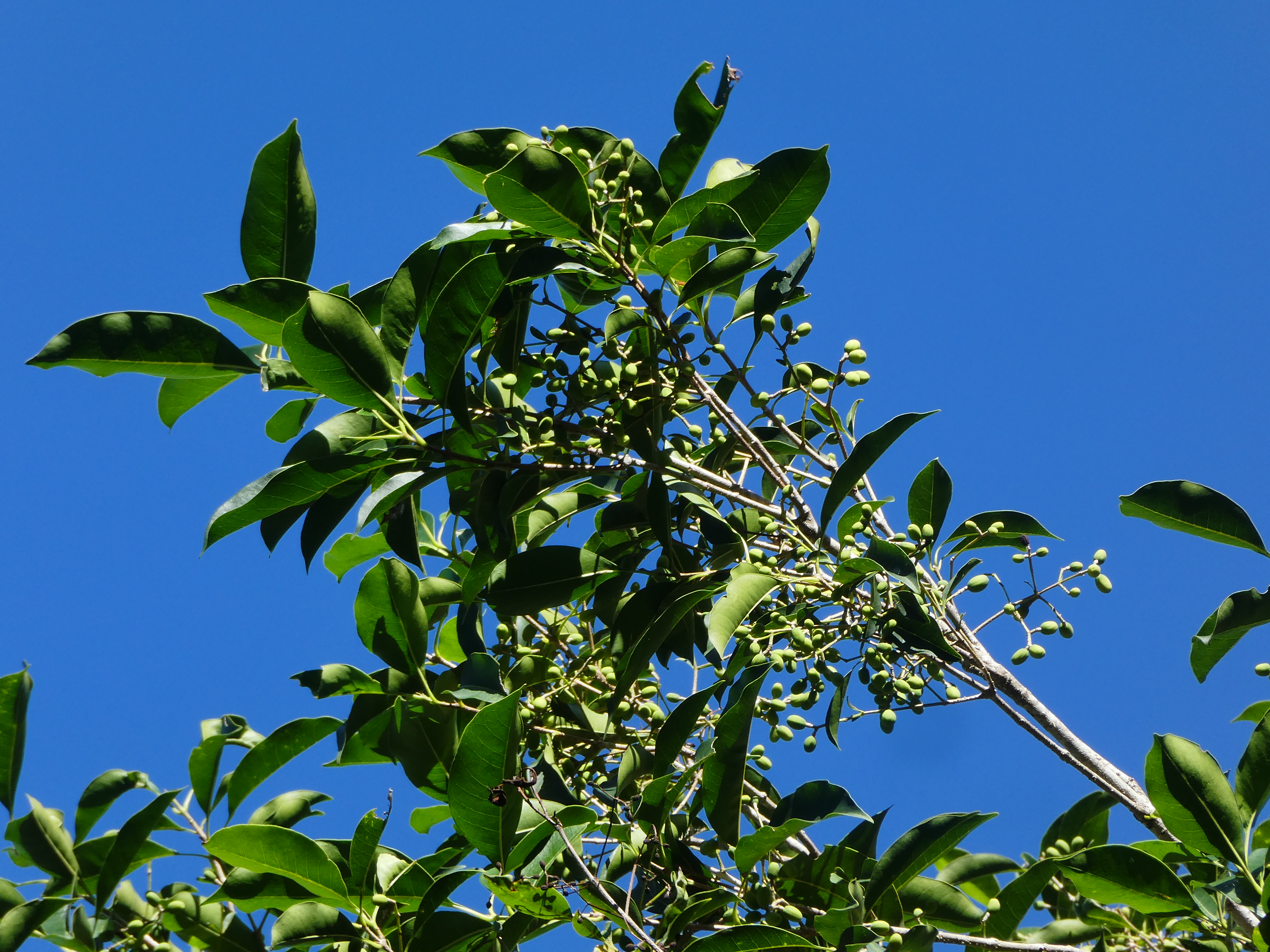
Immature fruit

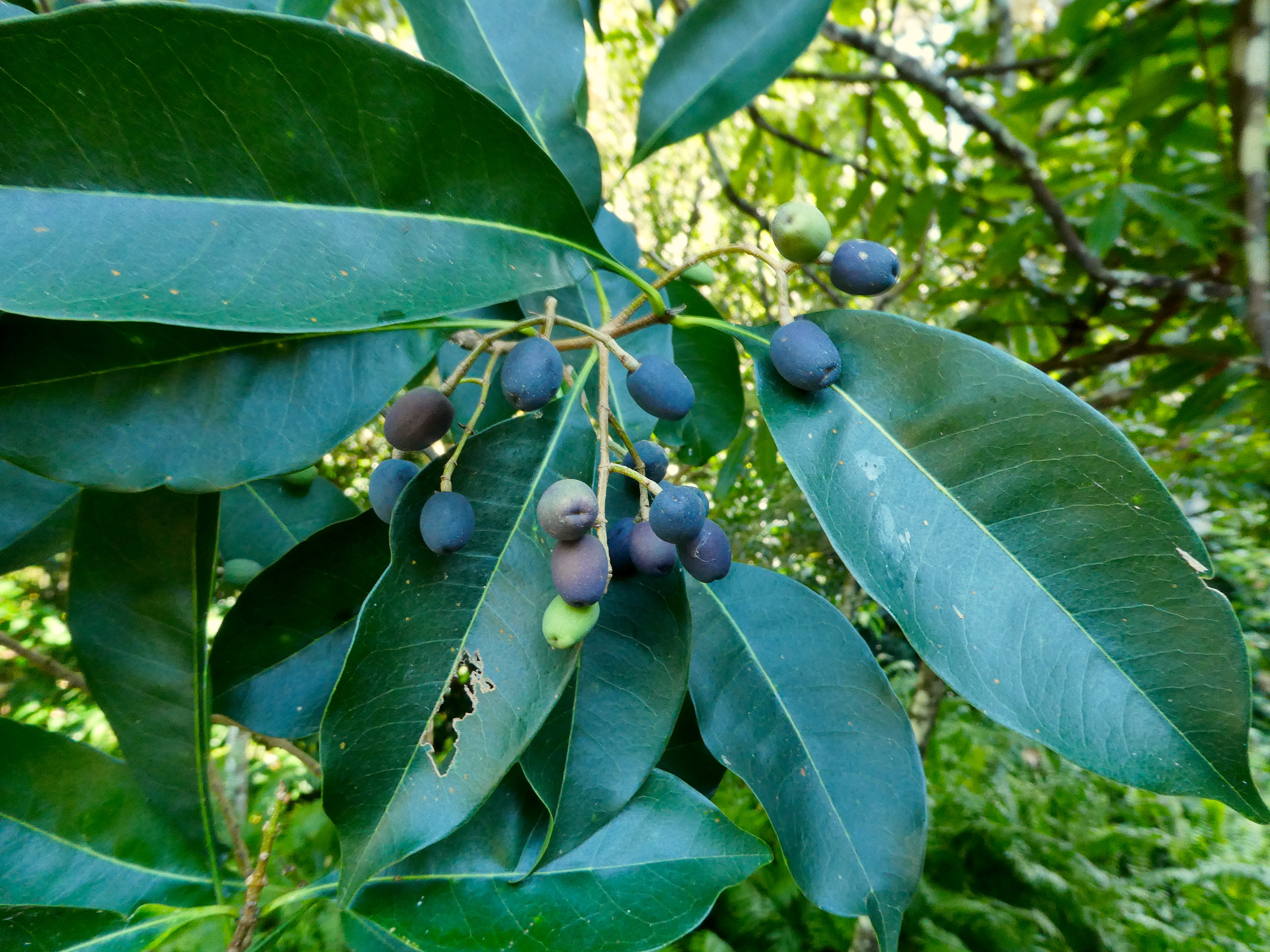
Mature fruit

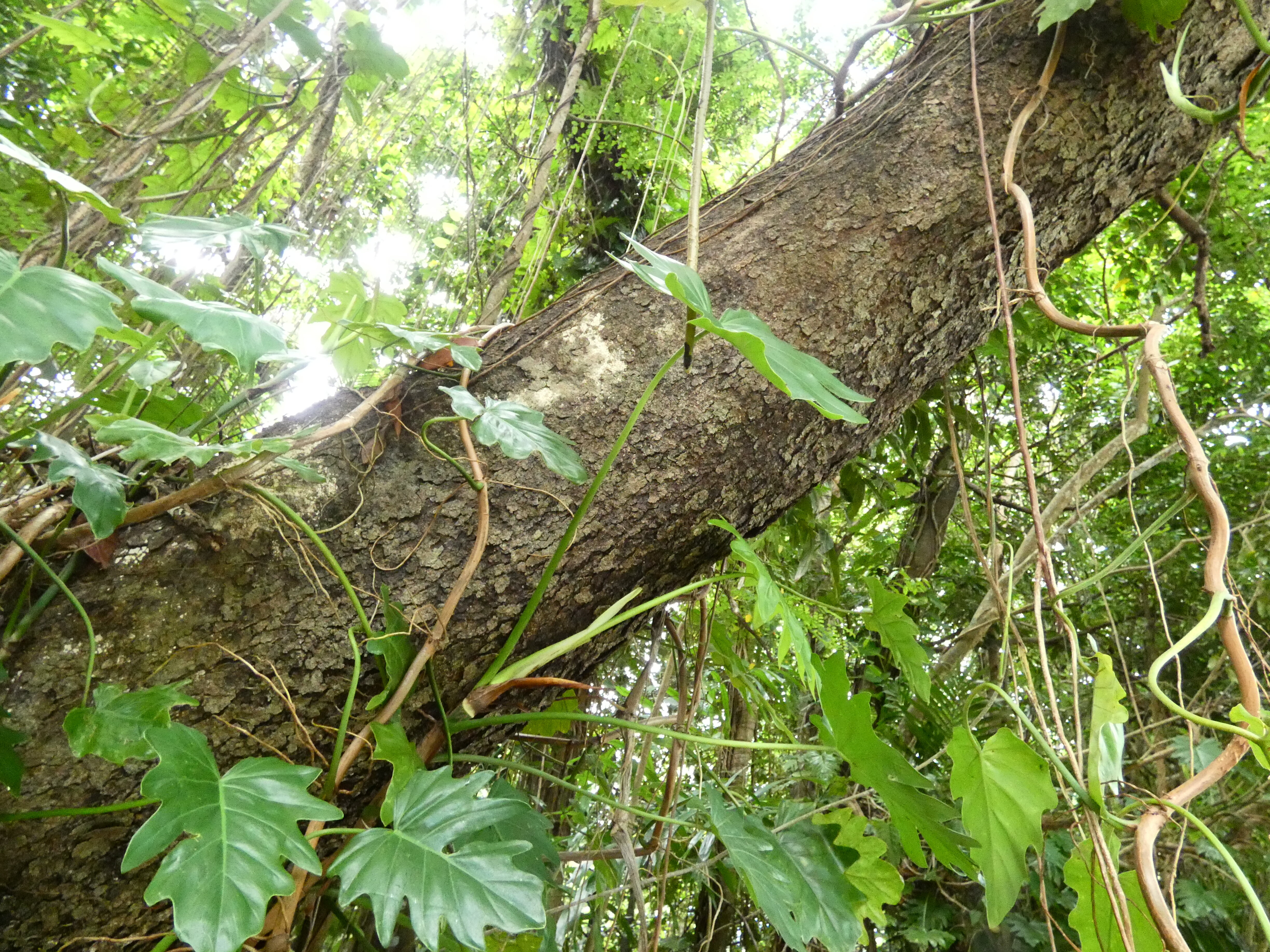
Trunk of large tree
