= Chionanthus crassifolius =

Scientific classification
- Kingdom: Plantae
- Clade: Tracheophytes
- Clade: Angiosperms
- Clade: Eudicots
- Clade: Asterids
- Order: Lamiales
- Family: Oleaceae
- Genus: Chionanthus
- Species: C. crassifolius

Binomial name
- Chionanthus crassifolius (Mart.) P.S.Green

Subspecies
- Chionanthus crassifolius var. crassifolius; Chionanthus crassifolius var. elegans (Eichler) P.S. Green

Synonyms
- Chionanthus elegans (Eichler) Lozano & Fuertes; Linociera elegans Eichler; Mayepea elegans (Eichler) Kuntze

Species of flowering plant

Chionanthus crassifolius is a species of flowering plants in the family Oleaceae. It is found in Brazil.
