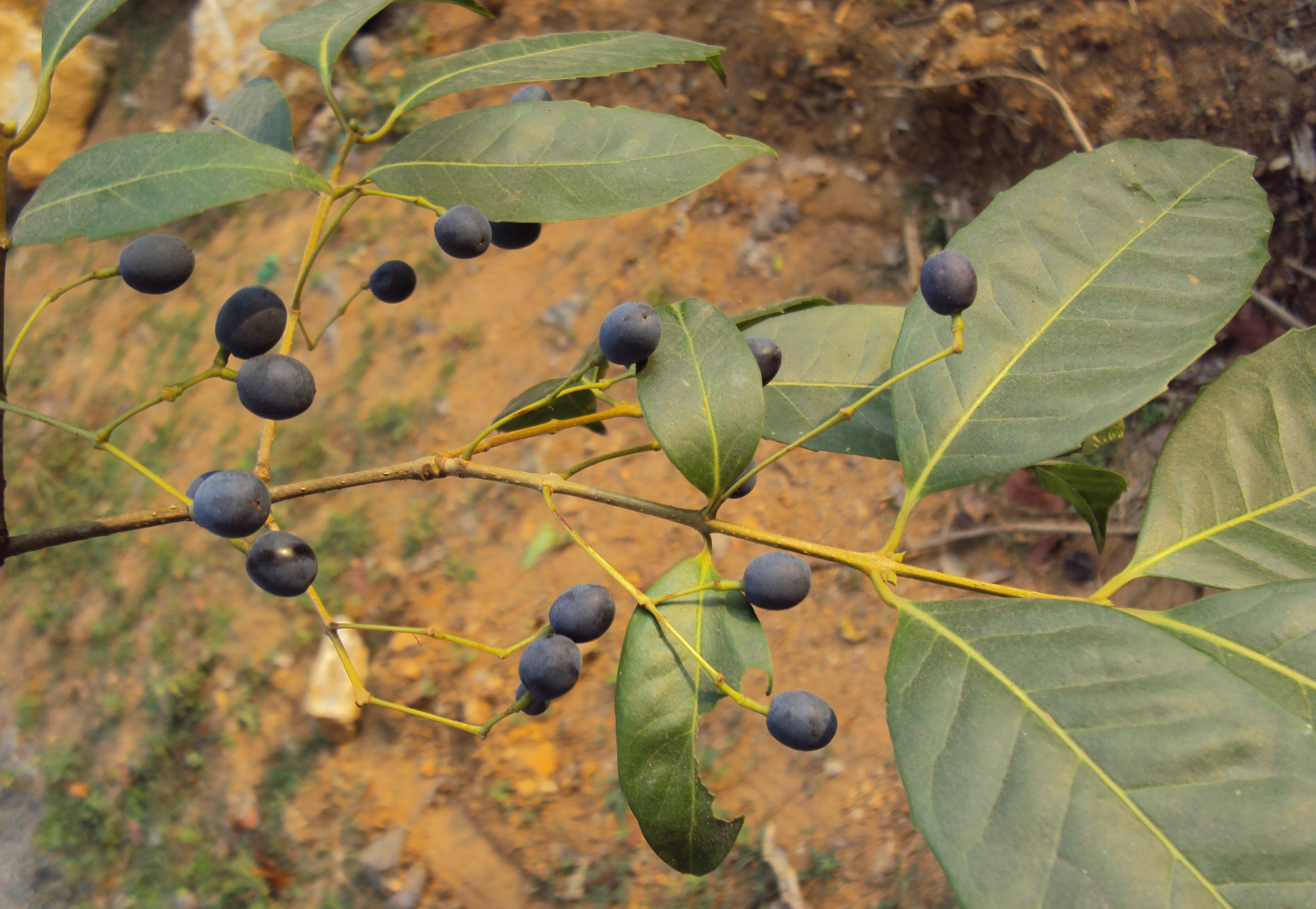

Scientific classification
- Kingdom: Plantae
- Clade: Tracheophytes
- Clade: Angiosperms
- Clade: Eudicots
- Clade: Asterids
- Order: Lamiales
- Family: Oleaceae
- Genus: Tetrapilus
- Species: T. dioicus

Binomial name
- Tetrapilus dioicus (Roxb.) L.A.S.Johnson

Synonyms
- Olea dioica Roxb.

= Tetrapilus dioicus =

Species of tree

Tetrapilus dioicus, commonly known as rose sandalwood, is a tree species native to the Indian subcontinent, including Bangladesh, India, Nepal, and Myanmar. It grows up to 15 m tall, with smooth grey bark and oblong-elliptic, leathery leaves that are 7–12 cm long, either entire or with distant serrations. The species bears small greenish-white to pinkish-tinged flowers arranged in opposite panicles, usually blooming between December and March. Its fleshy, purplish circular fruits contribute to its presence in wet tropical regions, notably in places like Khandala and Mahabaleshwar in Maharashtra.
