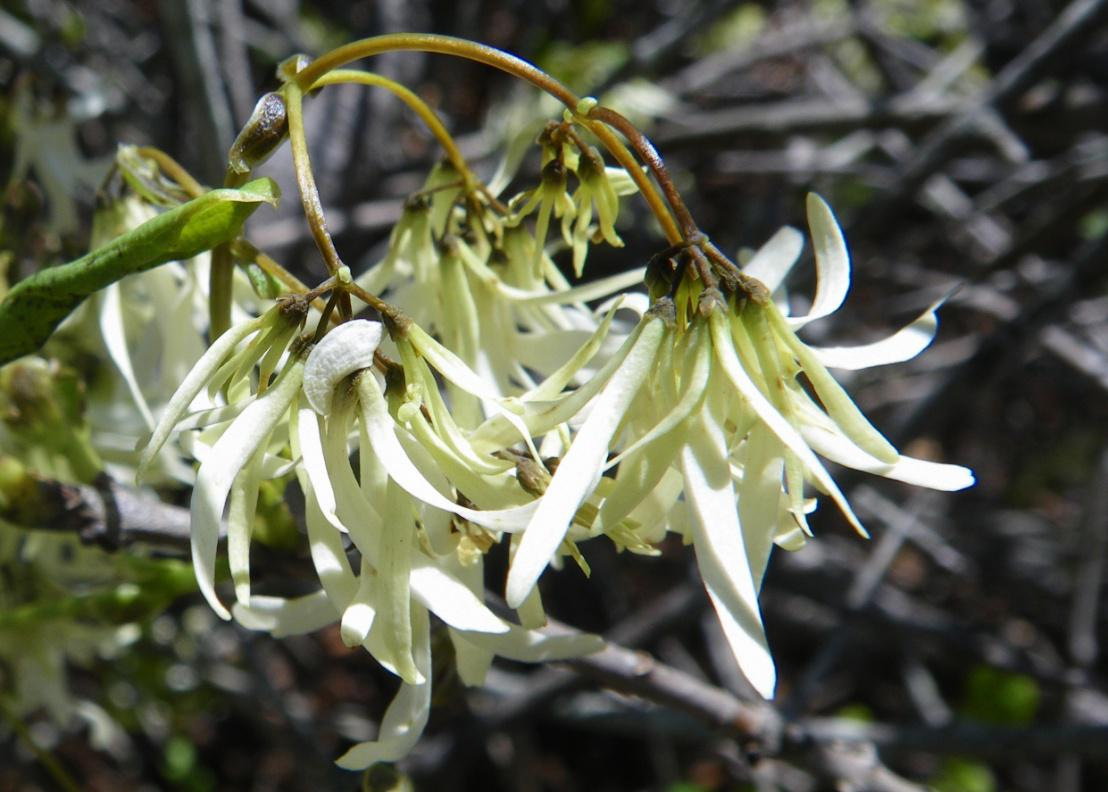

Conservation status
- Endangered (IUCN 3.1)

- Endangered (ESA)

Scientific classification
- Kingdom: Plantae
- Clade: Tracheophytes
- Clade: Angiosperms
- Clade: Eudicots
- Clade: Asterids
- Order: Lamiales
- Family: Oleaceae
- Genus: Chionanthus
- Species: C. pygmaeus

Binomial name
- Chionanthus pygmaeus Small

Synonyms
- Chionanthus pygmaea Small

= Chionanthus pygmaeus =

Species of flowering plant

Chionanthus pygmaeus is a rare species of flowering plant in the olive family known by the common name pygmy fringetree. It is endemic to Florida, where there are 46 known occurrences as of 2010. The plant is found in increasingly rare habitat in Central Florida that is being consumed for development, and some protected areas are not managed adequately. Most populations are small. It is a federally listed endangered species of the United States.

== Characteristics ==
This plant is variable in growth habit. It is usually a shrub remaining under a meter tall, but at times may grow into a tree 4 to 5 meters in height. The branches may grow directly from the sand if totally buried in a dune. The dark yellowish-green, leathery leaves are rough in shape and up to 10 centimeters long. The petioles may be maroon in color. The inflorescence is a panicle of three to six flowers borne in the leaf axils. The fragrant flower has four elongated, narrow lobes in its bell-shaped corolla and measures up to 1.5 centimeters long. The drooping panicle with many narrow corolla lobes may appear fringelike, hence the plant's common name. The fruit is a drupe up to 2.5 centimeters long which ripens purple or brownish. The plant reproduces sexually via seed and vegetatively by growing new shoots. It resprouts after its aboveground parts are burned away in the fire. It is a dioecious species. It is probably quite long-lived.

== Habitat ==
The plant grows in Florida scrub, sandhills, hammocks, flatwoods, and transition zones between these habitats. Many of these ecosystems are endangered and degraded, with remaining fragments under pressure from destructive forces. It is a plant of the well-drained yellow and white sands that remain from the ancient dunes that once covered this section of Central Florida. Many populations are known to have been extirpated because they occurred on valuable private land and were destroyed when the properties were developed. Most of its 46 occurrences are located on protected property, such as Lake Wales Ridge National Wildlife Refuge. Not all of this protected land is managed properly, however. Most of the habitats in which the plants grow, such as scrub and sandhills, are dependent on periodic fires for their health and maintenance. When a fire occurs now it is generally quickly extinguished, preventing the natural fire regime. Many areas, even in protected, conserved sites, are overgrown today because they have not burned in many years. This and many other plants in these ecosystems cannot grow when they are shaded by tall woody vegetation.

This plant may be a dominant species in some very localized areas, and may be codominant with other shrubs and trees, forming thickets. It has been noted to grow alongside yellow plum (Ximenia americana), silk bay (Persea humilis), scrub hickory (Carya floridana), sand pine (Pinus clausa), sandhill rosemary (Ceratiola ericoides), and several oaks. It grows with its relative, white fringetree (Chionanthus virginicus), and sometimes hybridizes with it.

More research is needed for this species, because many aspects of its life history, reproduction, pollination, population biology, fire ecology, genetics, and other factors in its biology are unknown.

== Endangered status ==
There are 53 known occurrences of this plant. In general, the populations are small, in some cases made up of a single plant. The United States Fish and Wildlife Service will not downlist the species to threatened status until there is reliable scientific evidence describing the population size and characteristics necessary for the continued survival of the species. Also, its habitat must be safe from damage and degradation, including improper fire management and outright destruction in the conversion of the land to housing or agriculture use.
