= Chionanthus havilandii =

Scientific classification
- Kingdom: Plantae
- Clade: Tracheophytes
- Clade: Angiosperms
- Clade: Eudicots
- Clade: Asterids
- Order: Lamiales
- Family: Oleaceae
- Genus: Chionanthus
- Species: C. havilandii

Binomial name
- Chionanthus havilandii Kiew

Species of tree

Chionanthus havilandii grows as a tree up to 20 metres (70 ft) tall, with a trunk diameter of up to 35 centimetres (14 in). The bark is whitish. Inflorescences bear up to four pairs of fragrant yellow or white flowers. Fruit is green turning light brown, round, up to 2.5 centimetres (1 in) in diameter. Its habitat is forest near streams. C. havilandii is endemic to the Sarawak region of Malaysian Borneo.
