= Chionanthus albidiflorus =

Conservation status
- Critically Endangered (IUCN 2.3)

Scientific classification
- Kingdom: Plantae
- Clade: Tracheophytes
- Clade: Angiosperms
- Clade: Eudicots
- Clade: Asterids
- Order: Lamiales
- Family: Oleaceae
- Genus: Chionanthus
- Species: C. albidiflorus

Binomial name
- Chionanthus albidiflorus Thwaites

Species of flowering plant

Chionanthus albidiflorus (syn. Linociera albidiflora (Thwaites) C.B.Clarke) is a species of flowering plant in the family Oleaceae. It is endemic to Sri Lanka.

It is sometimes treated in the segregate genus Linociera, though this does not differ from Chionanthus in any character other than leaf persistence, not a taxonomically significant character.

== Culture ==
Known as "ඇබුල් හොර කහ - ambul hora kaha" in Sinhala.
