= Olea chimanimani =

Conservation status
- Least Concern (IUCN 3.1)

Scientific classification
- Kingdom: Plantae
- Clade: Tracheophytes
- Clade: Angiosperms
- Clade: Eudicots
- Clade: Asterids
- Order: Lamiales
- Family: Oleaceae
- Genus: Olea
- Species: O. chimanimani

Binomial name
- Olea chimanimani Kupicha

Species of shrub

Olea chimanimani is an olive shrub or small tree, growing 2–3 meters tall, in the family Oleaceae. It is found only in the Chimanimani Mountains (whence its name), which lay on the border dividing Mozambique and Zimbabwe. Confined only to a relatively small (600 km^{2}) area, it is locally common, growing in scrub vegetation among quartzite cliffs.
