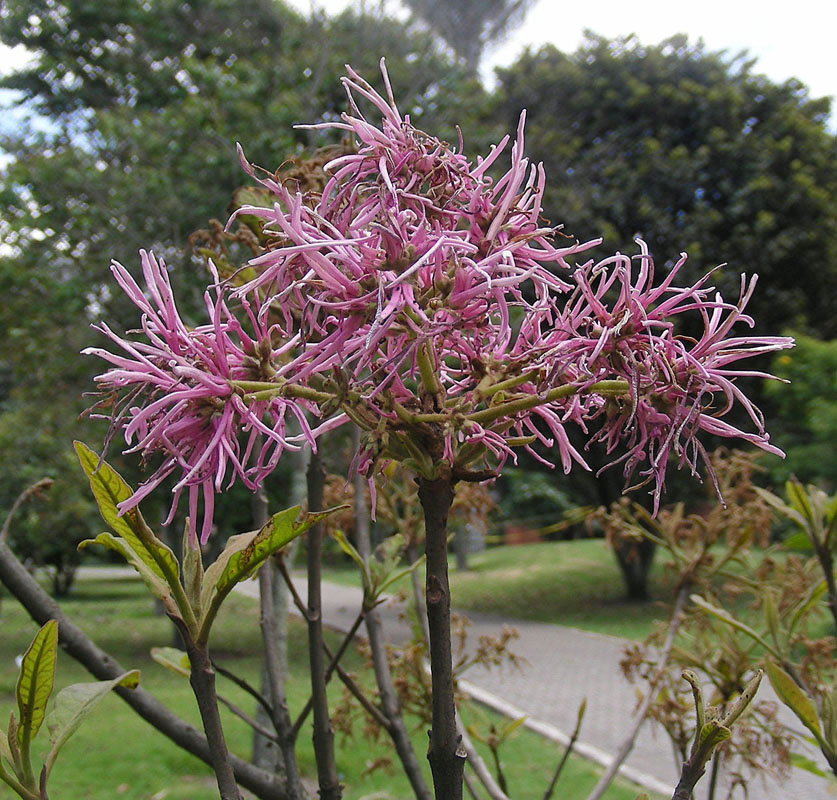

Conservation status
- Least Concern (IUCN 2.3)

Scientific classification
- Kingdom: Plantae
- Clade: Tracheophytes
- Clade: Angiosperms
- Clade: Eudicots
- Clade: Asterids
- Order: Lamiales
- Family: Oleaceae
- Genus: Chionanthus
- Species: C. pubescens

Binomial name
- Chionanthus pubescens Kunth

Synonyms
- Linociera pubescens (Kunth) Eichler

= Chionanthus pubescens =

Species of tree

Chionanthus pubescens is a tree in the family Oleaceae. It grows as a deciduous species and is sometimes cultivated as an ornamental tree.

== Distribution and habitat ==
Chionanthus pubescens is native to Ecuador and Peru. Its habitat is semi-deciduous forest, often occurring on hillsides.
