= Ilex havilandii =

Scientific classification
- Kingdom: Plantae
- Clade: Tracheophytes
- Clade: Angiosperms
- Clade: Eudicots
- Clade: Asterids
- Order: Aquifoliales
- Family: Aquifoliaceae
- Genus: Ilex
- Species: I. havilandii

Binomial name
- Ilex havilandii Loes.

Synonyms
- Ilex havilandii var. major W.W.Sm.

Species of plant in the holly family

Ilex havilandii is a species of flowering plant in the family Aquifoliaceae. It is endemic to Borneo. It is named for the British naturalist George Darby Haviland.

== Description ==
Ilex havilandii may grow as a shrub or as a tree up to 14 metres (50 ft) tall or as an epiphyte. The bark is white to grey. The leathery leaves are elliptic to oblong and measure up to 3.5 cm (1.4 in) long. The inflorescences, in racemes, feature white to pinkish-purple flowers. The round fruits are dark purple or reddish.

== Distribution and habitat ==
Ilex havilandii is endemic to Borneo. Its habitat is on ridges, in forests to elevations of 3,500 m (11,500 ft).
