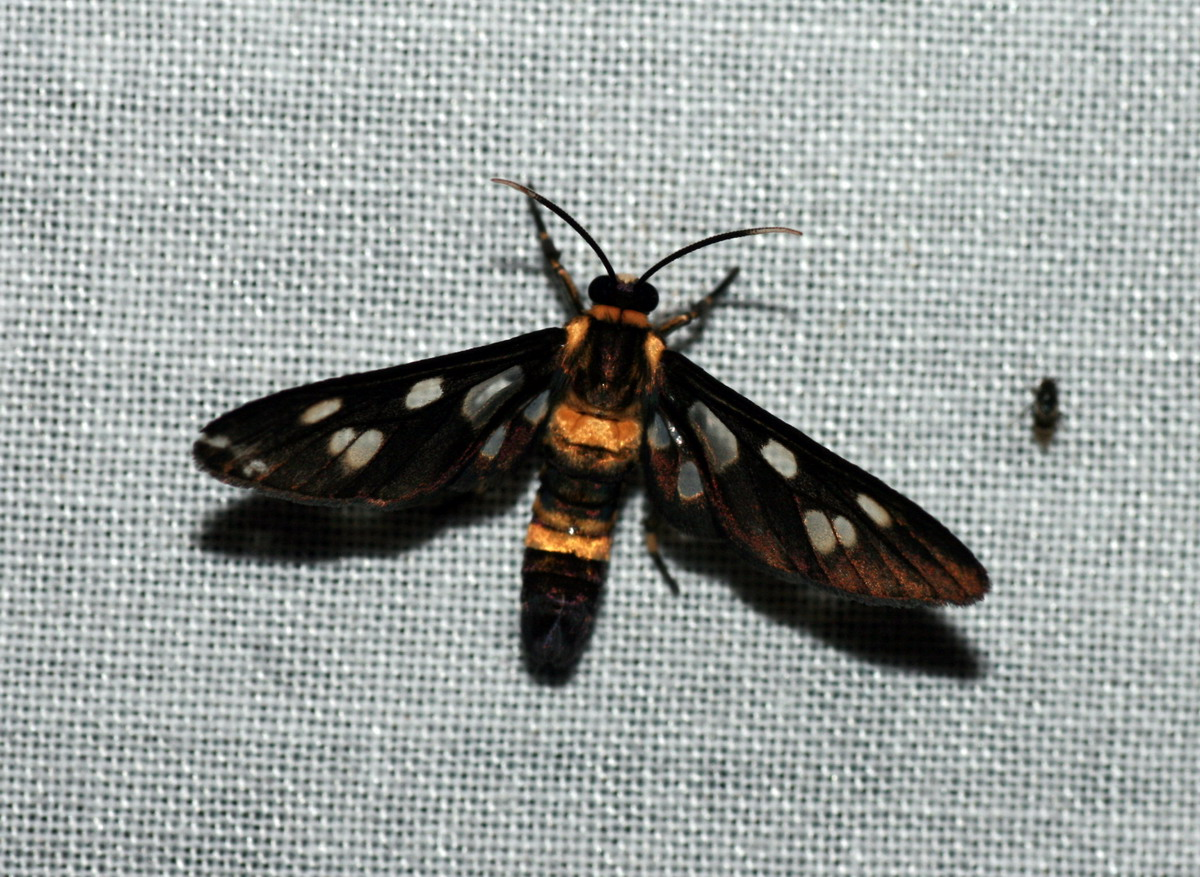
- Auriculoceryx pterodactyliformis

Scientific classification
- Kingdom: Animalia
- Phylum: Arthropoda
- Clade: Pancrustacea
- Class: Insecta
- Order: Lepidoptera
- Superfamily: Noctuoidea
- Family: Erebidae
- Subfamily: Arctiinae
- Tribe: Syntomini
- Genus: Auriculoceryx; Holloway, 1988

= Auriculoceryx =

Genus of moths

Auriculoceryx is a genus of moths in the family Erebidae erected by Jeremy Daniel Holloway in 1988.

== Species ==
- Auriculoceryx basalis (Walker, [1865])
- Auriculoceryx kannegieteri (Rothschild, 1910)
- Auriculoceryx pterodactyliformis (Holloway, 1976)
- Auriculoceryx transitiva (Walker, 1862)
