= Chionanthus cordulatus =

Conservation status
- Least Concern (IUCN 3.1)

Scientific classification
- Kingdom: Plantae
- Clade: Tracheophytes
- Clade: Angiosperms
- Clade: Eudicots
- Clade: Asterids
- Order: Lamiales
- Family: Oleaceae
- Genus: Chionanthus
- Species: C. cordulatus

Binomial name
- Chionanthus cordulatus Koord.

Species of flowering plant

Chionanthus cordulatus is a species of flowering plant in the family Oleaceae. It grows as a shrub or small tree up to 15 metres (49 ft) tall, with a trunk diameter of up to 30 centimetres (12 in). Bark is greenish. The flowers are white or yellowish green. Fruit is greyish green and round, up to 2.5 centimetres (0.98 in) in diameter. Habitat is lowland forest from sea-level to 930 metres (3,050 ft) elevation. C. cordulatus is found in Malaysia (Sabah) and Indonesia (Sulawesi).
