= Clifford Evans (ecologist) =

British ecologist

George Clifford Evans (1913–2006) was a British ecologist. He was President of the British Ecological Society (1975–1976) and Chairman of the British Photobiological Society (1979–1981). He was a fellow and Bursar of St John's College, Cambridge, who held his portrait, and wrote the textbook The Quantitative Analysis of Plant Growth. An obituary by the Department of Plant Sciences also cited his work on sunflecks and light interception in forest understories as particularly important.

Evans and his wife, Jessie Margaret (née Hadfield), were the parents of British-Malaysian botanist Ruth Kiew. He died in 2006 and was buried in the churchyard of Coton, Cambridgeshire. His papers are held by the University of Cambridge.
