= Chionanthus henryae =

Mary Henry's fringetree

Scientific classification
- Kingdom: Plantae
- Clade: Tracheophytes
- Clade: Angiosperms
- Clade: Eudicots
- Clade: Asterids
- Order: Lamiales
- Family: Oleaceae
- Genus: Chionanthus
- Species: C. henryae

Binomial name
- Chionanthus henryae H.L.Li

Species of flowering plant

Chionanthus henryae is a species of flowering plant in the family Oleaceae. It is native to the southeastern United States. It has been reported from Florida, Alabama, Georgia, Arkansas. Species is named for Mary Henry, an avid plant collected who collected many thousands of specimens, including the type of this species (from Okaloosa County, Florida in 1941).
