= Diospyros havilandii =

Conservation status
- Endangered (IUCN 3.1)

Scientific classification
- Kingdom: Plantae
- Clade: Tracheophytes
- Clade: Angiosperms
- Clade: Eudicots
- Clade: Asterids
- Order: Ericales
- Family: Ebenaceae
- Genus: Diospyros
- Species: D. havilandii

Binomial name
- Diospyros havilandii Bakh.

Species of flowering plant

Diospyros havilandii is a tree in the family Ebenaceae. It is native to Borneo.

== Description ==
Diospyros havilandii grows up to 13 m (40 ft) tall. The twigs are reddish brown when young, drying whitish. The inflorescences bear up to five flowers. The fruits are ellipsoid to round, drying black, measuring up to 1.6 cm (0.6 in) in diameter.

== Taxonomy ==
Diospyros havilandii was described by the Dutch botanist Reinier van den Brink in The Gardens' Bulletin, Straits Settlements in 1933. The type specimen was collected in Kuching, Borneo. The species is named for the British naturalist George Darby Haviland.

== Distribution and habitat ==
Diospyros havilandii is endemic to Borneo, where it is confined to Sarawak. Its habitat is peat swamp forests.

== Conservation ==
Diospyros havilandii has been assessed as endangered on the IUCN Red List. It is threatened by conversion of land for palm oil plantations and urban development. The species is not known from any protected areas.
