= Karnity =

- Village
- Location within Poland
- Coordinates: 53°45′01″N 19°44′28″E
- Country: Poland
- Voivodeship: Warmian-Masurian
- County: Ostróda
- Gmina: Miłomłyn

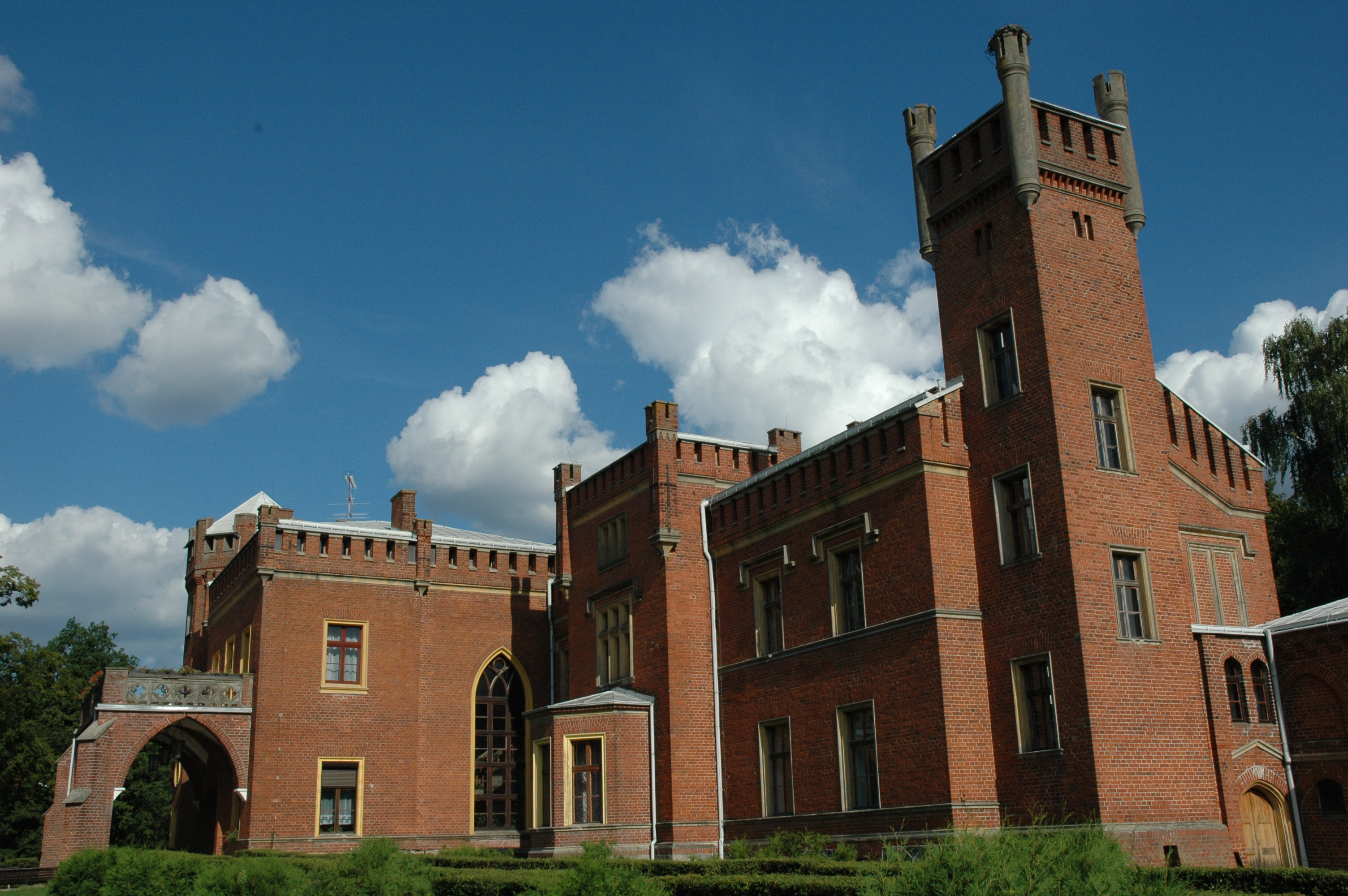
the Manor house

Karnity [karˈnitɨ] (German Groß Karnitten) is a village in the administrative district of Gmina Miłomłyn, within Ostróda County, Warmian-Masurian Voivodeship, in northern Poland.

== Notable people ==
- Emil Friedrich Knoblauch (1864–1936) was a German botanist.
