= Auriculoceryx basalis =

Scientific classification
- Kingdom: Animalia
- Phylum: Arthropoda
- Class: Insecta
- Order: Lepidoptera
- Superfamily: Noctuoidea
- Family: Erebidae
- Subfamily: Arctiinae
- Genus: Auriculoceryx
- Species: A. basalis

Binomial name
- Auriculoceryx basalis (Walker, [1865])

Synonyms
- Syntomis basalis Walker, [1865]; Amata vandepolli Rothschild, 1910; Ceryx klossi Rothschild, 1920

Species of moth

Auriculoceryx basalis is a moth of the family Erebidae. It was described by Francis Walker in 1865. It is found on Peninsular Malaysia, Sumatra and in Thailand.
