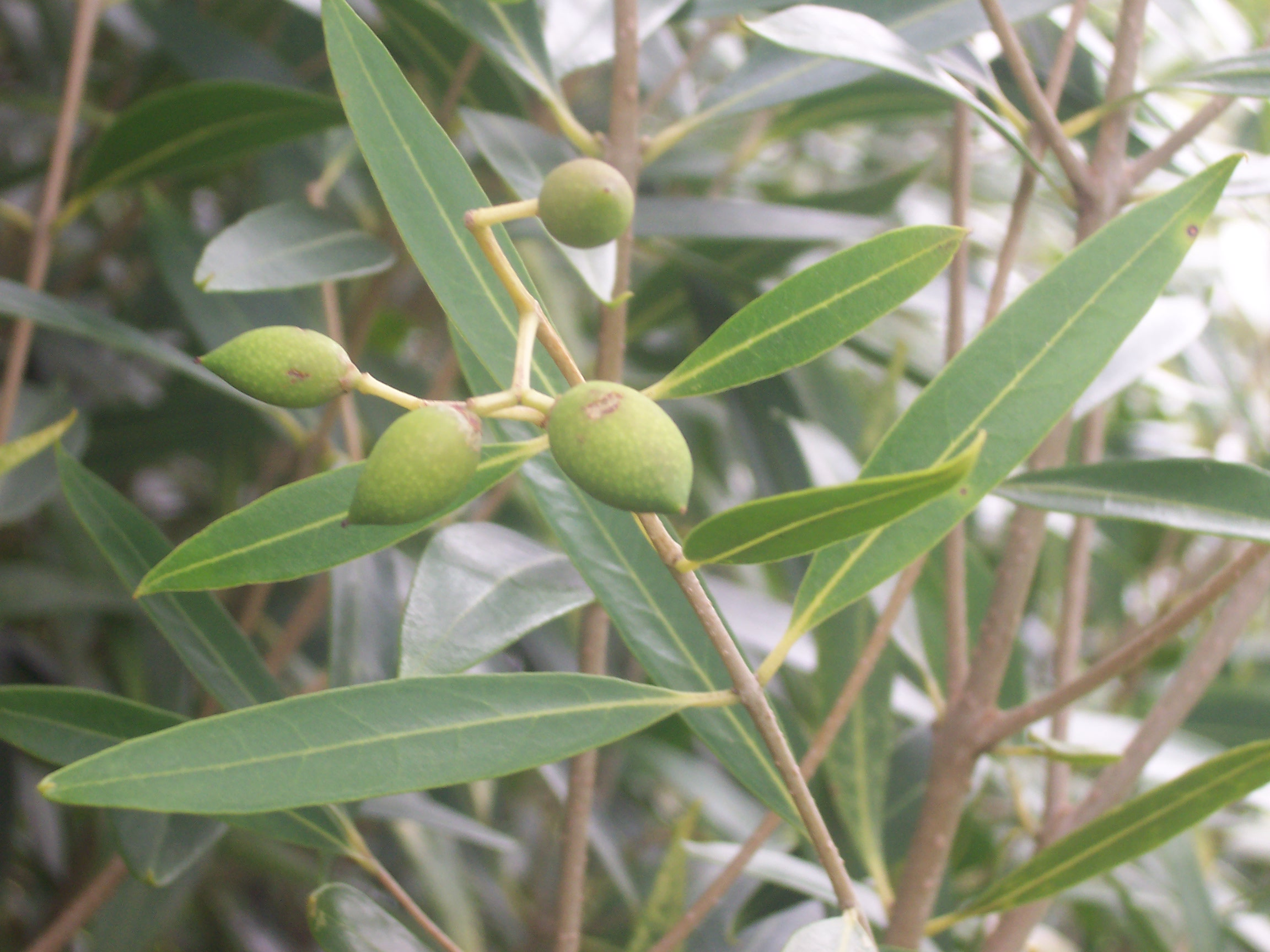
- Olea lancea fruit

Scientific classification
- Kingdom: Plantae
- Clade: Tracheophytes
- Clade: Angiosperms
- Clade: Eudicots
- Clade: Asterids
- Order: Lamiales
- Family: Oleaceae
- Genus: Olea
- Species: O. lancea

Binomial name
- Olea lancea Lam.

Synonyms
- Steganthus lancea (Lam) Knobl.

= Olea lancea =

Species of shrub

Olea lancea grows as a shrub or small tree up to 6 metres (20 ft) tall.

== Distribution ==
It is known from Madagascar, Mauritius, La Réunion and Rodrigues.
