= Tetrapilus rubrovenius =

Scientific classification
- Kingdom: Plantae
- Clade: Tracheophytes
- Clade: Angiosperms
- Clade: Eudicots
- Clade: Asterids
- Order: Lamiales
- Family: Oleaceae
- Genus: Tetrapilus
- Species: T. rubrovenius

Binomial name
- Tetrapilus rubrovenius (Elmer) L.A.S.Johnson (1957)

Synonyms
- Ilex decussata Heine (1953); Linociera rubrovenia Elmer (1909); Olea rubrovenia (Elmer) Kiew (1999); Olea decussata (Heine) Kiew (1979)

Species of flowering plant

Tetrapilus rubrovenius is a species of flowering plant in the olive family, Oleaceae. It is a tree is native to Borneo and the Philippines.

== Description ==
Tetrapilus rubrovenius grows as a shrub or tree, up to 30 metres (100 ft) tall, with a trunk diameter of up to 20 centimetres (8 in). The bark is whitish.

The specific epithet rubrovenius is from the Latin meaning 'red veins', referring to the leaf veins.

The fragrant flowers are creamy white or greenish yellow.

The fruit ripens into a purple-black olive.
