= Chionanthus zeylanicus =

Scientific classification
- Kingdom: Plantae
- Clade: Tracheophytes
- Clade: Angiosperms
- Clade: Eudicots
- Clade: Asterids
- Order: Lamiales
- Family: Oleaceae
- Genus: Chionanthus
- Species: C. zeylanicus

Binomial name
- Chionanthus zeylanicus Thwaites

Species of flowering plant

Chionanthus zeylanicus is a species of flowering plant in the family Oleaceae. It is endemic to Sri Lanka. Some state that it can also found in Southern India, but it is not accepted yet.

== Trunk ==
Bark - white or gray, smooth.

== Culture ==
Known as "ගෙරි ඇට - geri eta" in Sinhala, and as "kattimuruchan" in Tamil.
