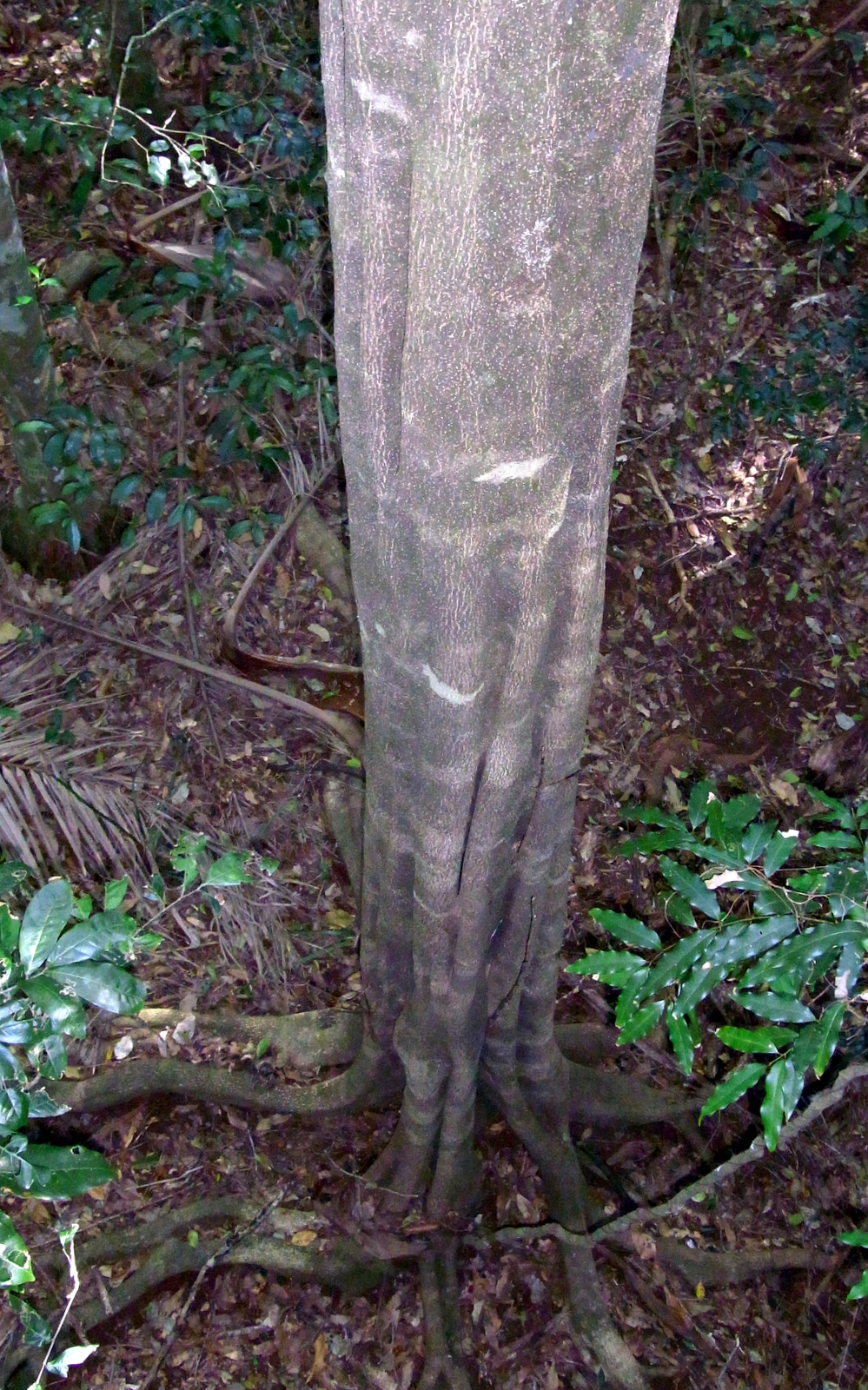
- Tree at Sea Acres National Park, Australia

Scientific classification
- Kingdom: Plantae
- Clade: Embryophytes
- Clade: Tracheophytes
- Clade: Spermatophytes
- Clade: Angiosperms
- Clade: Eudicots
- Clade: Asterids
- Order: Lamiales
- Family: Oleaceae
- Genus: Olea
- Species: O. paniculata

Binomial name
- Olea paniculata R.Br.

Synonyms
- Olea glandulifera Desf.; Olea glandulifera Wall. ex G.Don; Olea glandulosa DC.; Olea thozettii Pancher & Sebert; Olea bournei Fyson; Linociera lauterbachii Lingelsh.; Ligustrum neoebudicum Guillaumin; Linociera yunnanensis H.T.Chang

= Olea paniculata =

Species of flowering plant

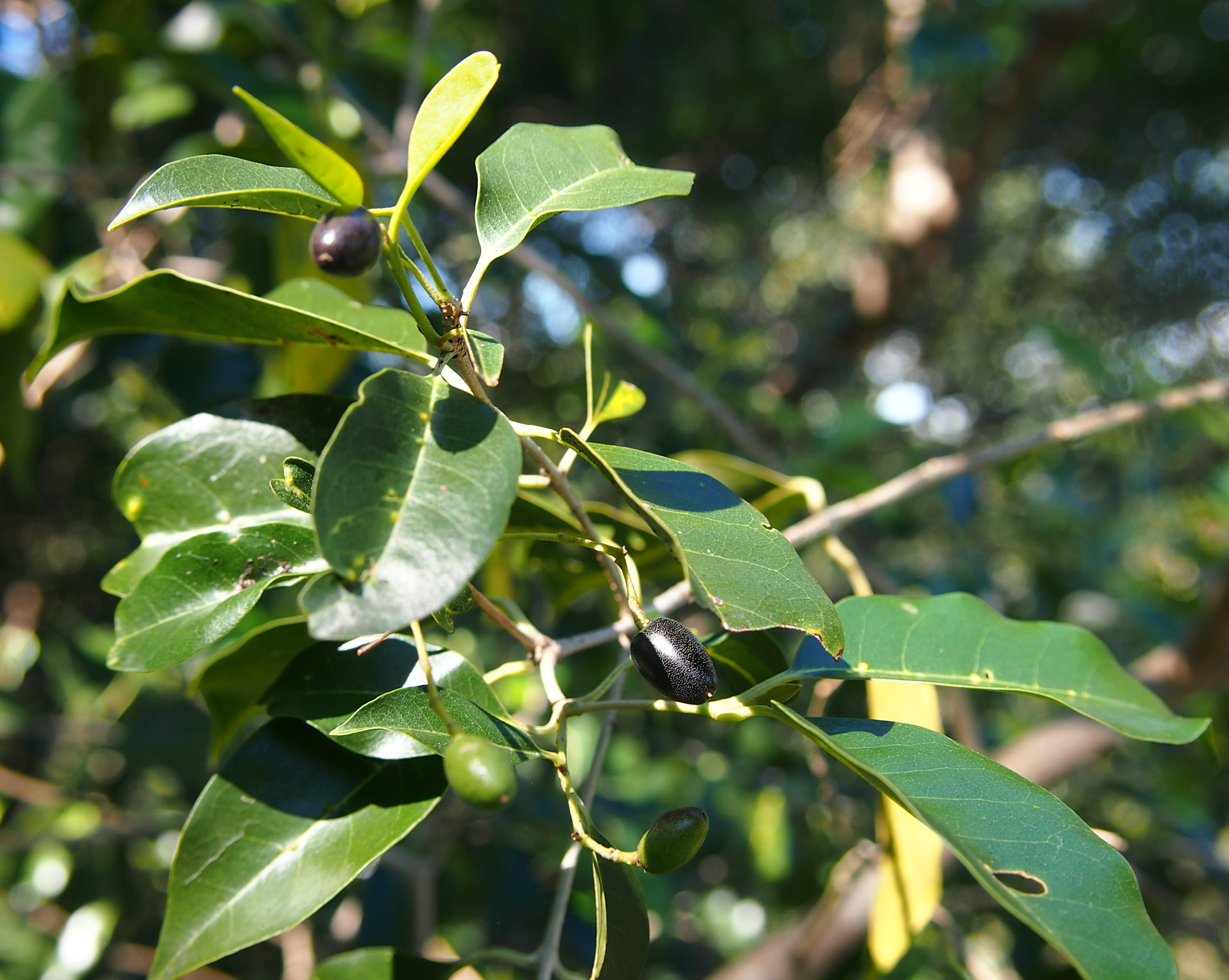
Foliage and fruit

Olea paniculata, commonly known as the native olive, is a plant of the genus Olea and a relative of the olive. It grows natively in Pakistan, India and southwestern China (Yunnan) through tropical Southeast Asia to Australia (Queensland and New South Wales) and the Pacific islands of New Caledonia, Vanuatu and Lord Howe Island.

== Description ==
It grows as a bushy tree to 30 m (98 ft), often with a sparse canopy. The trunk has smooth grey-brown bark and reaches a maximum diameter of 90 cm (35 in) with some buttressing. The shiny green ovate to elliptical leaves measure 5–10 cm (2.0–3.9 in) in length, and 1.5–6 cm (0.59–2.36 in) in width, and have a pointed (acuminate) end. The blue-black fruit are oval and measure 0.8–1.2 (0.3–0.5 in) cm long. They are ripe from May to September.

It resembles the introduced and weedy African olive Olea europaea subsp. cuspidata, but the latter lacks O. paniculata's small depressions between the main and secondary veins on the back of the leaf. The introduced species is found in disturbed areas such as roadsides and waterways.

== Taxonomy ==
One of many species first described by Robert Brown in his 1810 work Prodromus Florae Novae Hollandiae, it still bears its original binomial name. Other common names include Australian olive, pigeonberry ash, maulwood, and clove berry. In Chinese, it is called 腺叶木犀榄 (pinyin: xiànyè mùxī lǎn). The specific name is derived from the Latin panicula "tuft", from the arrangement of flowers.

== Distribution and habitat ==
Olea paniculata is found from North East Queensland to the vicinity of the Hunter Region in New South Wales. In Australia it is found near watercourses in dry rainforests. Outside Australia it is found in Yunnan province in southwestern China, where it occurs in sheltered wetter valleys 1,200–2,400 m (3,900–7,900 ft) in altitude, as well as India, Indonesia, Kashmir, Malaysia, Nepal, New Guinea, Pakistan, and Sri Lanka. On Lord Howe Island it is widespread below around 500 m (1,600 ft) elevation. It is also found on New Caledonia and Vanuatu.

== Ecology ==
The fruit are consumed by the Australian king parrot, brown cuckoo-dove, topknot pigeon, rose-crowned fruit-dove, wompoo fruit-dove, white-headed pigeon, green catbird and regent bowerbird in Australia.

== Uses ==
It is a fast pioneer species on sunny protected sites, but needs well drained soil for good growth. It is a butterfly host plant whose black fruit attracts birds. The fruit was traditionally eaten by Aboriginal Australians.
