= Shorea havilandii =

Conservation status
- Least Concern (IUCN 3.1)

Scientific classification
- Kingdom: Plantae
- Clade: Tracheophytes
- Clade: Angiosperms
- Clade: Eudicots
- Clade: Rosids
- Order: Malvales
- Family: Dipterocarpaceae
- Genus: Shorea
- Species: S. havilandii

Binomial name
- Shorea havilandii Brandis

Synonyms
- Hopea ovalifolia Boerl.

Species of flowering plant

Shorea havilandii is a tree in the family Dipterocarpaceae. It is native to Borneo.

== Description ==
Shorea havilandii grows up to 45 m (150 ft) tall, with a trunk diameter of up to 50 cm (20 in). It has buttresses up to 0.7 m (2.3 ft) tall. The bark is flaky to cracked. The leathery leaves are elliptic to ovate and measure up to 16 cm (6 in) long. The inflorescences measure up to 12 cm (5 in) long and bear up to seven cream flowers.

== Taxonomy ==
Shorea havilandii was described by Dietrich Brandis in the Botanical Journal of the Linnean Society in 1895. The type specimen was collected near Kuching in Sarawak, Borneo. The species is named for the English naturalist George Darby Haviland.

== Distribution and habitat ==
Shorea havilandii is endemic to Borneo. Its habitat is in kerangas and swamp forests, to elevations of around 400 m (1,300 ft).

== Conservation ==
Shorea havilandii has been assessed as least concern on the IUCN Red List and is considered abundant although declining in population. There are some threats to the species, including conversion of land for intensive agriculture, such as palm oil plantations. The species is also threatened by logging for its timber. Shorea havilandii does occur in a number of protected areas.
