= Auriculoceryx transitiva =

Scientific classification
- Kingdom: Animalia
- Phylum: Arthropoda
- Class: Insecta
- Order: Lepidoptera
- Superfamily: Noctuoidea
- Family: Erebidae
- Subfamily: Arctiinae
- Genus: Auriculoceryx
- Species: A. transitiva

Binomial name
- Auriculoceryx transitiva (Walker, 1862)

Synonyms
- Syntomis transitiva Walker, 1862; Syntomis intermissa Walker, 1862; Ceryx transitiva

Species of moth

Auriculoceryx transitiva is a species of moth in the family Erebidae. It is found on Borneo. The habitat consists of lowland areas.
