= Alsophila havilandii =

Scientific classification
- Kingdom: Plantae
- Clade: Tracheophytes
- Division: Polypodiophyta
- Class: Polypodiopsida
- Order: Cyatheales
- Family: Cyatheaceae
- Genus: Alsophila
- Species: A. havilandii

Binomial name
- Alsophila havilandii (Baker) R.M.Tryon

Synonyms
- Cyathea havilandii Baker; Cyathea paleacea Copel.; Cyathea rigida Copel.

Species of plant

Alsophila havilandii, synonym Cyathea havilandii, is a species of tree fern endemic to Kinabalu National Park in Borneo, where it grows in ridge forest at an altitude of 2,400–3,000 m (7,900–9,800 ft). It is a rather small species, having an erect trunk about 50 cm (20 in) tall or more. Fronds are narrow, erect and tripinnate. They are usually about 1 m (3 ft 3 in) in length. The stipe is dark and warty. It bears medium brown scales with fragile edges. Sori are borne on either side of the midvein of fertile pinnules and protected by firm, dark indusia.

The specific epithet havilandii commemorates George Darby Haviland (1857–1901), who collected numerous plants in Malaysia.
