= Tetrapilus =

Scientific classification
- Kingdom: Plantae
- Clade: Tracheophytes
- Clade: Angiosperms
- Clade: Eudicots
- Clade: Asterids
- Order: Lamiales
- Family: Oleaceae
- Tribe: Oleeae
- Subtribe: Oleinae
- Genus: Tetrapilus; Lour. (1790)

Species
- 22; see text

Synonyms
- Pachyderma Blume (1826); Picricarya Dennst. (1818)

Genus of plants

Tetrapilus is a genus of flowering plants in the olive family, Oleaceae. It includes 22 species native to south and southeast Asia, ranging from India through Indochina and southern China to Malesia.

Genus Tetrapilus was first described by João de Loureiro in 1790. It was later subsumed into genus Olea as subgenus. A phylogenomic analysis discovered that the species in subgenus Tetrapilus and Olea caudatilimba did not share a most recent common ancestor with the other Olea species (subgenera Olea and Paniculatae), making Olea polyphyletic. These species were transferred to the revived genus Tetrapilus.

== Species ==
22 species are accepted:

- Tetrapilus borneensis (Boerl.) de Juana
- Tetrapilus brachiatus Lour.
- Tetrapilus caudatilimbus (L.C.Chia) de Juana
- Tetrapilus cordatulus (H.L.Li) L.A.S.Johnson
- Tetrapilus dioicus (Roxb.) L.A.S.Johnson
- Tetrapilus gagnepainii (Knobl.) de Juana
- Tetrapilus gamblei (C.B.Clarke) de Juana
- Tetrapilus hainanensis (H.L.Li) L.A.S.Johnson
- Tetrapilus javanicus (Blume) de Juana
- Tetrapilus laxiflorus (H.L.Li) L.A.S.Johnson
- Tetrapilus moluccensis (Kiew) de Juana
- Tetrapilus neriifolius (H.L.Li) de Juana
- Tetrapilus obovatus (Merr.) de Juana
- Tetrapilus palawanensis (Kiew) de Juana
- Tetrapilus parvilimbus (Merr. & Chun) de Juana
- Tetrapilus polygamus (Wight) L.A.S.Johnson
- Tetrapilus roseus (Craib) L.A.S.Johnson
- Tetrapilus rubrovenius (Elmer) L.A.S.Johnson
- Tetrapilus salicifolius (Wall. ex G.Don) de Juana
- Tetrapilus tetragonocladus (L.C.Chia) de Juana
- Tetrapilus tsoongii (Merr.) de Juana
- Tetrapilus wightianus (Wall. ex G.Don) de Juana
