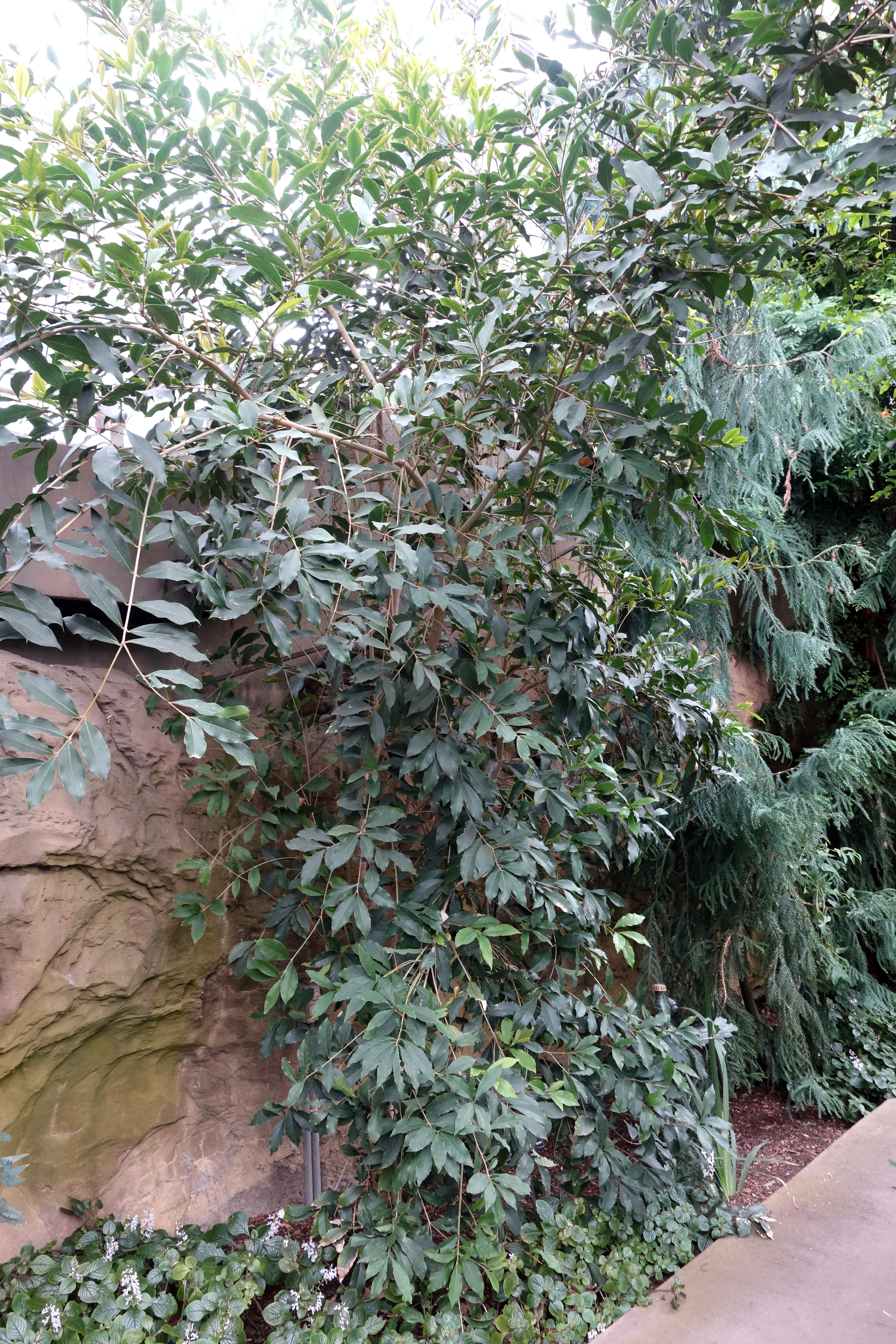

Scientific classification
- Kingdom: Plantae
- Clade: Tracheophytes
- Clade: Angiosperms
- Clade: Eudicots
- Clade: Asterids
- Order: Lamiales
- Family: Oleaceae
- Genus: Tetrapilus
- Species: T. tsoongii

Binomial name
- Tetrapilus tsoongii (Merr.) de Juana (2020)

Synonyms
- Ligustrum tsoongii Merr. (1922); Olea brevipes L.C.Chia (1955); Olea tsoongii (Merr.) P.S.Green (1995); Olea yuennanensis Hand.-Mazz. (1936); Olea yuennanensis var. xeromorpha Hand.-Mazz. (1936); Tetrapilus yuennanensis (Hand.-Mazz.) de Juana (2020)

= Tetrapilus tsoongii =

Species of shrub

Tetrapilus tsoongii is a species of flowering plant in the olive family, Oleaceae. It is native to southern China, where it grows in the provinces of Guangdong, Guangxi, Guizhou, Hainan, Sichuan, and Yunnan. It is a shrub or tree 3–15 meters in height, with its seed oil used in food and industry.
