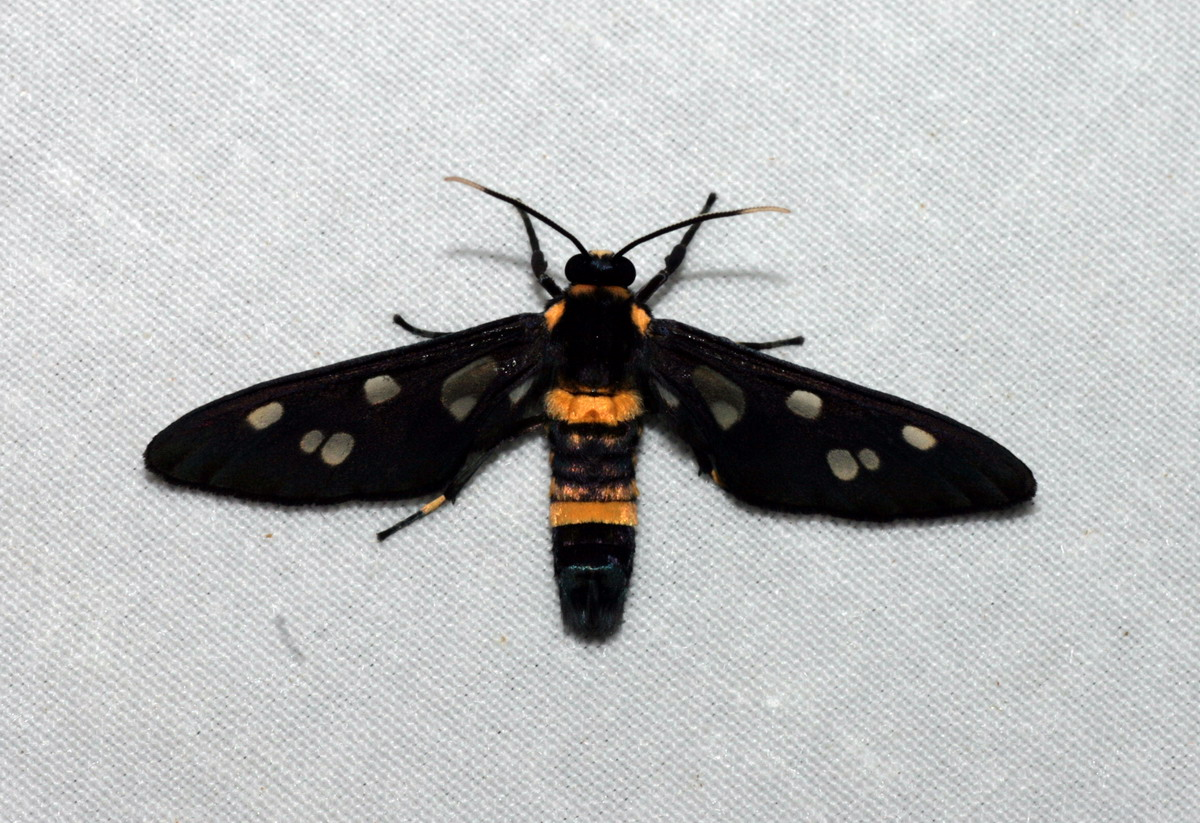

Scientific classification
- Kingdom: Animalia
- Phylum: Arthropoda
- Clade: Pancrustacea
- Class: Insecta
- Order: Lepidoptera
- Superfamily: Noctuoidea
- Family: Erebidae
- Subfamily: Arctiinae
- Genus: Auriculoceryx
- Species: A. pterodactyliformis

Binomial name
- Auriculoceryx pterodactyliformis (Holloway, 1976)

Synonyms
- Ceryx pterodactyliformis Holloway, 1976

= Auriculoceryx pterodactyliformis =

Species of moth

Auriculoceryx pterodactyliformis is a moth of the family Erebidae. It was described by Jeremy Daniel Holloway in 1976. It is found on Borneo. The habitat consists of forested localities and open habitats, ranging from the lowlands to about 1,760 meters.
