= Lithocarpus havilandii =

Scientific classification
- Kingdom: Plantae
- Clade: Tracheophytes
- Clade: Angiosperms
- Clade: Eudicots
- Clade: Rosids
- Order: Fagales
- Family: Fagaceae
- Genus: Lithocarpus
- Species: L. havilandii

Binomial name
- Lithocarpus havilandii (Stapf) Barnett

Synonyms
- Castanopsis havilandii (Stapf) Boerl.; Lithocarpus abendanonii (Valeton) A.Camus; Quercus abendanonii Valeton; Quercus havilandii Stapf

Species of tree

Lithocarpus havilandii is a tree in the beech family Fagaceae. It is native to Borneo and Sulawesi.

The species was first described as Quercus havilandii by Otto Stapf in 1894. It is named for the British surgeon and naturalist George Darby Haviland. In 1944 Euphemia Cowan Barnett placed the species in genus Lithocarpus as L. haviliandii.

== Description ==
Lithocarpus havilandii grows as a tree up to 25 metres (80 ft) tall with a trunk diameter of up to 40 cm (16 in). The greyish brown bark is smooth, flaky or lenticellate. Its coriaceous leaves measure up to 9.5 cm (4 in) long. The flowers are solitary on the rachis. The brownish acorns are ovoid to conical and measure up to 2 cm (1 in) across.

== Distribution and habitat ==
Lithocarpus havilandii grows naturally in western Borneo and central and southern Sulawesi. Its habitat is montane forests from 1,300 m (4,300 ft) to 2,500 m (8,000 ft) elevation.
