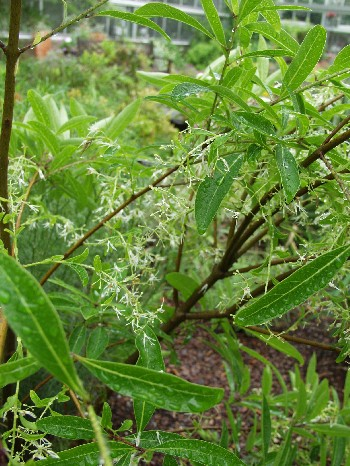
- Chionanthus pygmaeus

Scientific classification
- Kingdom: Plantae
- Clade: Tracheophytes
- Clade: Angiosperms
- Clade: Eudicots
- Clade: Asterids
- Order: Lamiales
- Family: Oleaceae
- Tribe: Oleeae
- Subtribe: Oleinae
- Genus: Chionanthus; Royen

Synonyms
- Bonamica Vell.; Ceranthus Schreb.; Cylindria Lour.; Freyeria Scop.; Linociera Sw. ex Schreb.; Majepea Post & Kuntze; Mayepea Aubl.; Minutia Vell.; Sarlina Guillaumin; Tessarandra Miers; Thouinia L.f.

= Chionanthus =

Genus of trees

Chionanthus (/ˌkaɪoʊˈnænθəs/), common name: fringetrees, is a genus of about 140 species of flowering plants in the family Oleaceae.

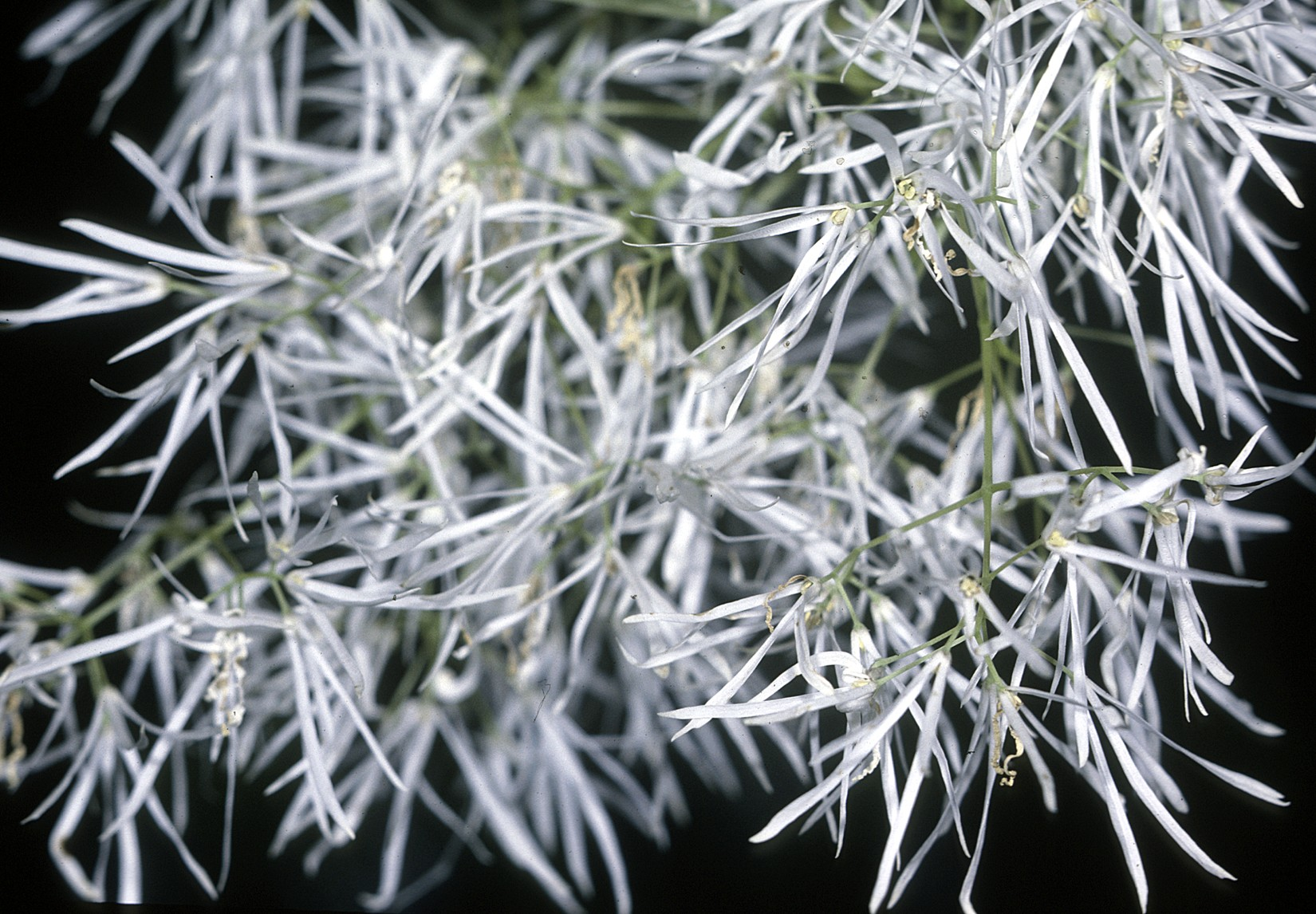
Chionanthus virginicus flowers

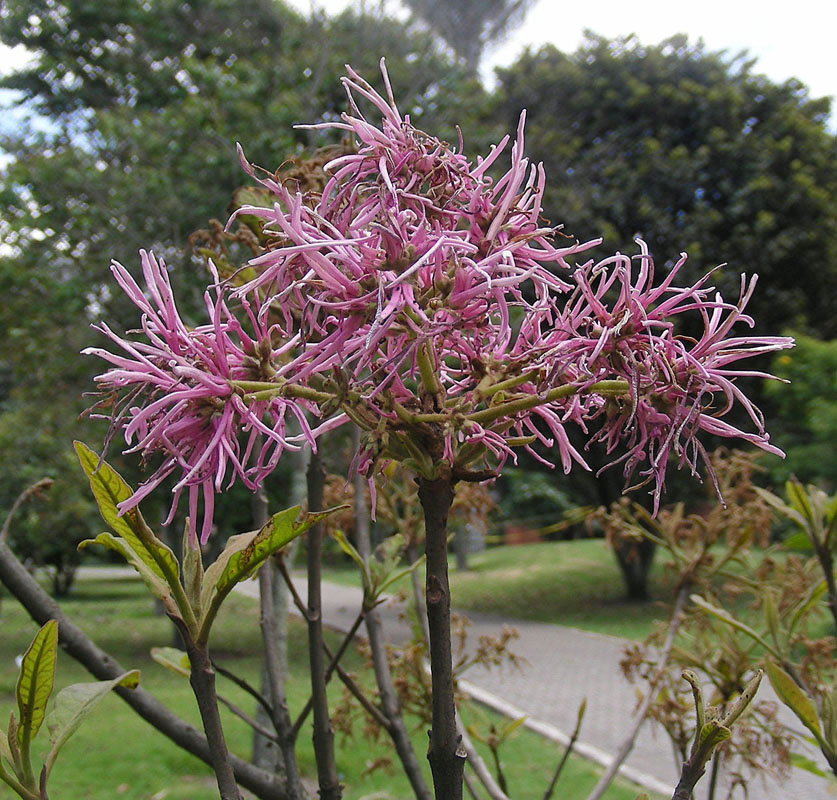
Chionanthus pubescens

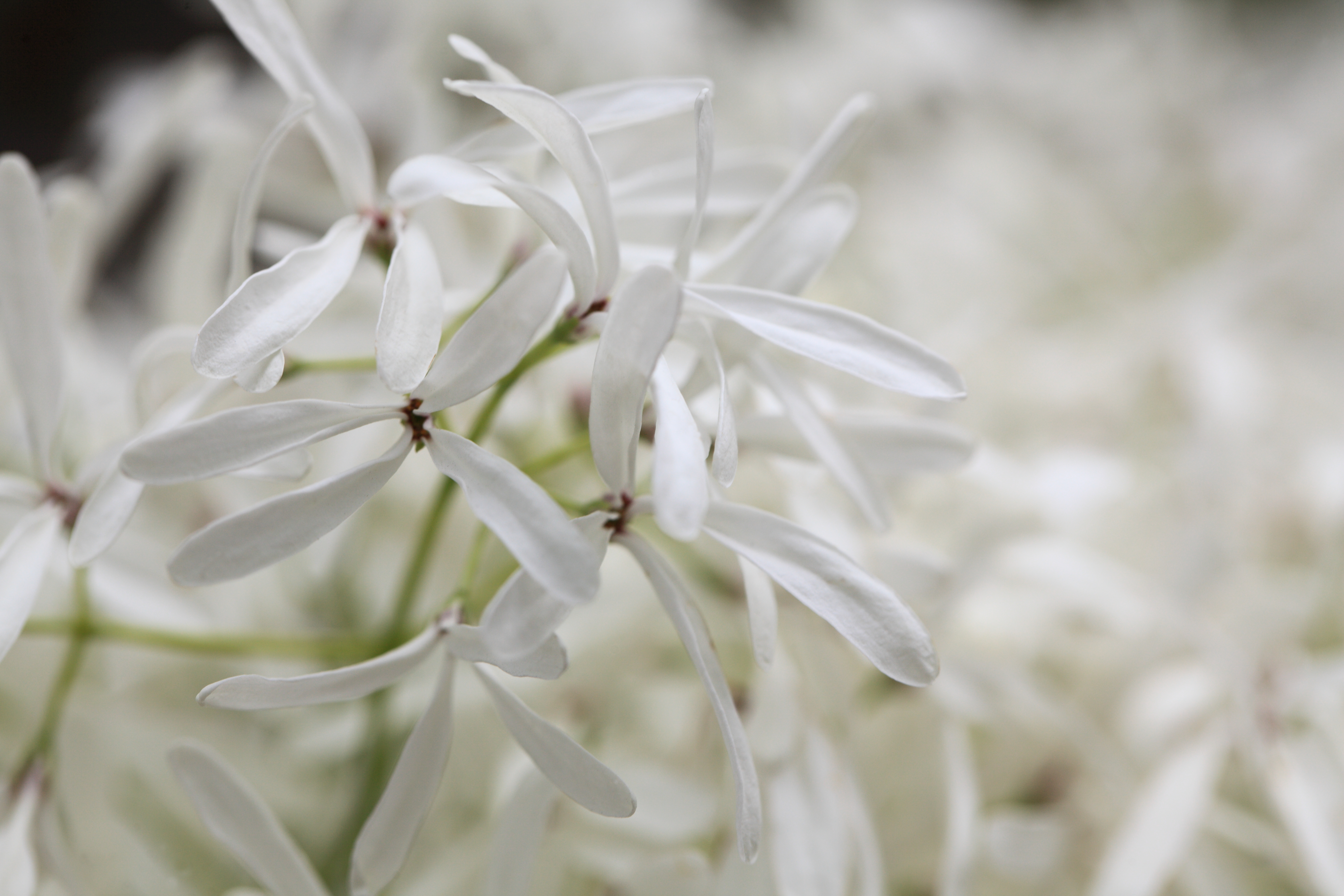
Chionanthus retusus flowers

The genus has a wide distribution primarily in the tropics and subtropics, but with three species extending north into temperate regions, one (C. retusus) in eastern Asia and two (C. virginicus and C. henryae) in eastern North America. Most of the tropical species are evergreen, while the three temperate species are deciduous. Some botanists restrict Chionanthus to the deciduous, temperate species, treating the evergreen species in a separate genus Linociera, but apart from leaf persistence, there is no other consistent difference between them.

They are shrubs and small to medium-sized trees growing to 3–25 m tall. The leaves are opposite, simple. The flowers are produced in feathery panicles, with a corolla subdivided into four slender lobes; they are white, pale yellow, or tinged pink. The fruit is a drupe containing a single seed.

== Species ==
As of February 2026, Plants of the World Online accepts the following 139 species:

- Chionanthus abriaquiensis Fern.Alonso & Cogollo
- Chionanthus acuminatissimus (Merr.) Kiew ex de Juana
- Chionanthus acunae (Borhidi & O.Muñiz) Borhidi
- Chionanthus adamsii Stearn
- Chionanthus albidiflorus Thwaites
- Chionanthus amblirrhinus P.S.Green
- Chionanthus avilensis (Steyerm.) P.S.Green
- Chionanthus axillaris R.Br.
- Chionanthus axilliflorus (Griseb.) Stearn
- Chionanthus bakeri (Urb.) Stearn
- Chionanthus balgooyanus Kiew
- Chionanthus beccarii (Stapf) Kiew
- Chionanthus brachystachys (Schltr.) P.S.Green
- Chionanthus brassii (Kobuski) Kiew
- Chionanthus bumelioides (Griseb.) Stearn
- Chionanthus callophylloides Kiew
- Chionanthus callophyllus Blume
- Chionanthus caudifolius (Ridl.) Kiew
- Chionanthus caymanensis Stearn
- Chionanthus celebicus Koord.
- Chionanthus chrysopetalus Cornejo ex Lombardi
- Chionanthus clementis (Quisumb. & Merr.) Kiew
- Chionanthus colonchensis Cornejo & Bonifaz
- Chionanthus compactus Sw.
- Chionanthus cordulatus Koord.
- Chionanthus coriaceus (S.Vidal) Yuen P.Yang & S.Y.Lu
- Chionanthus courtallensis Bedd.
- Chionanthus crassifolius (Mart.) P.S.Green
- Chionanthus crispus Kiew
- Chionanthus curvicarpus Kiew
- Chionanthus cuspidatus Blume
- Chionanthus decipiens P.S.Green
- Chionanthus densiflorus Zoll. & Moritzi
- Chionanthus dictyophyllus (Urb.) Stearn
- Chionanthus domingensis Lam.
- Chionanthus dussii (Krug & Urb.) Stearn
- Chionanthus ellipticus Blume
- Chionanthus enerve (Steenis) Kiew
- Chionanthus eriorachis (Kerr) P.S.Green
- Chionanthus evenius (Stapf) Kiew
- Chionanthus ferrugineus (Gilg) P.S.Green
- Chionanthus filiformis (Vell.) P.S.Green
- Chionanthus fluminensis (Miers) P.S.Green
- Chionanthus gardneriorum Kiew
- Chionanthus gigas (Lingelsh.) Kiew
- Chionanthus globosus (Kiew) Kiew
- Chionanthus glomeratus Blume
- Chionanthus grandifolius (Elmer) Kiew
- Chionanthus greenii Lombardi
- Chionanthus guangxiensis B.M.Miao
- Chionanthus guianensis (Aubl.) Pers.
- Chionanthus hahlii (Rech.) Kiew
- Chionanthus hainanensis (Merr. & Chun) B.M.Miao
- Chionanthus harmandii (Gagnep.) de Juana
- Chionanthus havilandii Kiew
- Chionanthus henryae H.L.Li
- Chionanthus holdridgii (Camp & Monach.) Stearn
- Chionanthus implicatus (Rusby) P.S.Green
- Chionanthus jamaicensis (Urb.) Stearn
- Chionanthus kajewskii (Sleumer) Kiew
- Chionanthus kinabaluensis Kiew
- Chionanthus kostermansii Kiew
- Chionanthus lancifolius (Ridl.) Kiew
- Chionanthus leopoldii Kiew
- Chionanthus ligustrinus (Sw.) Pers.
- Chionanthus longiflorus (H.L.Li) B.M.Miao
- Chionanthus longipetalus (Merr.) Kiew
- Chionanthus lucens Kiew
- Chionanthus luzonicus Blume
- Chionanthus macrobotrys (Merr.) Kiew
- Chionanthus macrocarpus Blume
- Chionanthus macrothyrsus (Merr.) Soejarto & P.K.Lôc
- Chionanthus mala-elengi (Dennst.) P.S.Green
- Chionanthus maxwellii P.S.Green
- Chionanthus megistocarpus Fern.Alonso & Cogollo
- Chionanthus micranthus (Mart.) Lozano & Fuertes
- Chionanthus microbotrys (Kerr) P.S.Green
- Chionanthus microstigma (Gagnep.) P.S.Green
- Chionanthus minutiflorus Kurz
- Chionanthus montanus Blume
- Chionanthus monteazulensis Zavatin & Lombardi
- Chionanthus nitens Koord. & Valeton
- Chionanthus nitidus (Merr.) Kiew
- Chionanthus oblanceolatus (B.L.Rob.) P.S.Green
- Chionanthus oblongifolius Koord. & Valeton
- Chionanthus oliganthus (Merr.) Kiew
- Chionanthus pachyphyllus (Merr.) Kiew
- Chionanthus palustris Kiew
- Chionanthus panamensis (Standl.) Stearn
- Chionanthus parkinsonii (Hutch.) Bennet & Raizada
- Chionanthus parviflorus Cornejo, Lombardi & W.W.Thomas
- Chionanthus pedunculatus P.S.Green
- Chionanthus plurifloroides Kiew
- Chionanthus pluriflorus (Knobl.) Kiew
- Chionanthus polycephalus Kiew
- Chionanthus polygamus (Roxb.) Kiew
- Chionanthus porcatus Kiew
- Chionanthus proctorii Stearn
- Chionanthus pubescens Kunth
- Chionanthus pubicalyx (Ridl.) Kiew
- Chionanthus purpureus Lam.
- Chionanthus pygmaeus Small
- Chionanthus pyriformis Kiew
- Chionanthus quadristamineus F.Muell.
- Chionanthus racemosus (Merr.) Kiew & Pelser
- Chionanthus ramiflorus Roxb.
- Chionanthus remotinervius (Merr.) Kiew
- Chionanthus retusus Lindl. & Paxton
- Chionanthus riparius (Lingelsh.) Kiew
- Chionanthus robinsonii (Gagnep.) B.H.Quang
- Chionanthus rostratus (Teijsm. & Binn.) Miq.
- Chionanthus rugosus Kiew
- Chionanthus rupicola (Lingelsh.) Kiew
- Chionanthus sabahensis Kiew
- Chionanthus salicifolius (Lingelsh.) Kiew
- Chionanthus sessiliflorus (Hemsl.) Kiew
- Chionanthus sleumeri (C.T.White) Stearn
- Chionanthus sordidus Kiew
- Chionanthus spicatus Blume
- Chionanthus spicifer (Ridl.) Kiew
- Chionanthus stenurus (Merr.) Kiew
- Chionanthus subcapitatus (Merr.) B.H.Quang
- Chionanthus subsessilis (Eichler) P.S.Green
- Chionanthus sulawesicus Kiew
- Chionanthus sumatranus Blume
- Chionanthus sutepensis (Kerr) P.S.Green
- Chionanthus tenuis P.S.Green
- Chionanthus thorelii (Gagnep.) P.S.Green
- Chionanthus timorensis Blume
- Chionanthus trichotomus (Vell.) P.S.Green
- Chionanthus urbanii (Knobl.) Stearn
- Chionanthus vargasii Fern.Alonso & Cogollo
- Chionanthus velutinus (Kerr) P.S.Green
- Chionanthus verruculatus D.Fang
- Chionanthus virginicus L.
- Chionanthus vitiensis (Seem.) A.C.Sm.
- Chionanthus wurdackii B.Ståhl
- Chionanthus zeylanicus L.
- Chionanthus zollingerianus Koord. & Valeton
