= Tetrapilus brachiatus =

Conservation status
- Least Concern (IUCN 3.1)

Scientific classification
- Kingdom: Plantae
- Clade: Tracheophytes
- Clade: Angiosperms
- Clade: Eudicots
- Clade: Asterids
- Order: Lamiales
- Family: Oleaceae
- Genus: Tetrapilus
- Species: T. brachiatus

Binomial name
- Tetrapilus brachiatus Lour.

Synonyms
- Olea brachiata (Lour.) Merr. (1925); Olea depauperata Steud. (1841), nom. nud.; Olea maritima Wall. & G.Don (1837); Tetrapilus axillaris Raf. (1838)

Species of shrub

Tetrapilus brachiatus is a species of flowering plant in the olive family, Oleaceae. It grows as a shrub or small tree up to 10 metres (30 ft) tall, with a stem diameter of up to 5 centimetres (2 in). It has pale brown twigs and dull white flowers. Fruit ripens to purple-black. The specific epithet brachiata is from the Latin meaning 'branched', referring to the decussate inflorescence. T. brachiatus is native to China, Thailand, Cambodia, Vietnam, Malaysia and Indonesia.
