= Emil Friedrich Knoblauch =

German botanist (1864–1936)

Emil Friedrich Knoblauch (2 December 1864 – 10 February 1936) was a German botanist.

== Personal life ==
Knoblauch was born and raised in Groß Karnitten, Kreis Mohrungen. He studied at the University of Königsberg, obtaining his PhD in 1888. Later, he was associated with the botanical garden and museum in Göttingen.

He identified numerous species within the family Oleaceae, and was the taxonomic authority of the genera Leuranthus and Noldeanthus.

== Published works ==
He was editor of the sections on Oleaceae and Salvadoraceae in Engler and Prantl's Die Natürlichen Pflanzenfamilien. In Eugenius Warming's Handbuch der systematischen botanik (A handbook of systematic botany), he authored a revision of the "Fungi" section(s). Other noteworthy written efforts by Knoblauch include:

- Anatomie des holzes der laurineen, 1888 - Anatomy involving the wood of Laurineae.
- Ökologische Anatomie der Holzpflanzen der südafrikanischen immergrünen Buschregion, 1896 - Ecological anatomy of woody plants of the South African evergreen bush region.
