= Ruth Kiew =

Malaysian-British botanist (1946–2025)

- Born: Ruth Evans; 14 April 1946; Cambridge, England
- Died: 20 November 2025 (aged 79)
- Citizenship: United Kingdom; Malaysia
- Education: Cambridge University
- Occupations: Botanist and lecturer
- Known for: Study of Begoniaceae, Gesneriaceae, and limestone flora in Peninsular Malaysia and Borneo
- Spouse: Kiew Bong Heang (divorced)

Ruth Kiew (née Evans 14 April 1946 – 20 November 2025) was a Malaysian-British botanist focused on Peninsular Malaysia and Borneo. Kiew was the first woman to be awarded the David Fairchild Medal for plant exploration, by the National Tropical Botanical Garden, recognising her as "one of the world's great experts on tropical begonias" in 2002. The standard author abbreviation Kiew is used to indicate this person as the author when citing a botanical name.

== Early life and education ==
Ruth Evans was born in Cambridge on 14 April 1946, the daughter of two botanists both involved with Cambridge University, Jessie Margaret (nee Hadfield) Evans and Clifford Evans. Cambridge was the last British university to permit women to get a standard graduation, which occurred two years after Ruth Evans's birth, and it had inhibited her mother's (J. M. Evans) academic advancement. Consequently J. M. Evans, who became a biology teacher, was determined that her daughter should get the same opportunities that were open to male students. Ruth Evans took an undergraduate degree in psychology, which she later found to be "completely unscientific", before getting postgraduate qualifications in botany, and advancing to a doctorate in tropical plant taxonomy in 1972 under supervisor E. J. H. Corner, with the requirement to complete a year of fieldwork in the tropics.

== Career ==
With the encouragement of her father and her supervisor, Kiew started her fieldwork in Malaysia in 1969 under a Leverhulme scholarship. She intended to stay for a year but ended up spending most of the rest of her life there, or in Singapore. She was an expeditionary researcher on herbaceous plants, at a time when it was not an area of interest to many other scientists. She made at least two such expeditions a year, typically into Peninsular Malaysia or Borneo. Kiew described approximately 150 species, including Borneo's blue-capped thismia (Thismia goodii), and a perennial herb (Ridleyandra chuana), found only in two small areas of Peninsular Malaysia's mountainous forests. This was one of five Ridleyandra species identified by Kiew. When later in 2002 she was awarded the David Fairchild medal by the National Tropical Botanical Garden, the equivalent of Nobel Prize in botany, the director Paul Cox called her the botanical equivalent of Dian Fossey: "[Dr Kiew] is an expeditionary scientist who seeks to protect the biodiversity of the planet and conserve plants for generations to come."

In 1976, Kiew became a lecturer at the University of Putra Malaysia, and at one point in time had to lecture to 1040 Mixed Diploma students simultaneously. She was able to lecture in Malay to her students, and still maintained her fieldwork expeditions, often together with her husband who studies frogs.

From 1997 to 2005, Kiew served as the keeper of the herbarium of the Singapore Botanic Gardens, during which time 6,000 herbarium types were logged and recorded. The herbarium, which was in poor condition and did not have air conditioning before Kiew's arrival, saw major upgrades under her administration. She also conducted extensive sampling works for the herbarium in Sabah and Sarawak, often in collaboration with the forestry departments in those two states.

In 2006, Kiew was recruited by Saw Leng Guan to join the editorial team of the book series Flora of Peninsular Malaysia, a series published by the Forest Research Institute Malaysia (FRIM). She was involved in the editing of Series I: Ferns and Lycophytes and Series II: Seed Plants. Kiew also worked as an editor for Volume Seven of the Tree Flora of Sabah and Sarawak. She wrote natural history books for children to encourage their interest in the subject.

In 2013, Kiew, together with a group of FRIM researchers, explored the limestone hills in Merapoh, which are at risk of development due to their unprotected status, and found numerous rare and endemic plants, including one previously undescribed species. Some of these finds include Pararuellia sumatrana var. ridleyi, Rhynchoglossum obliqua, Pandanus irregularis, Spelaeanthus chinii, Zippelia begoniifolius, Monophyllaea musangensis, Tridynamia megalantha, Calciphilopteris alleniae, and Cleisostoma complicatum.

== Personal life and death ==
Soon after arriving in Malaysia in 1969, she met her future husband, Kiew Bong Heang, a zoologist. They later divorced but she retained Kiew as her surname. She was the mother of a son and daughter, Lisa Kiew and Nick Kiew. She also has a brother and two grandchildren. During her 56 years residence in Malaysia, she became a Malaysian citizen. She was hospitalised several weeks before the launch of her book Flowers of Fraser's Hill, Peninsular Malaysia on 2 November 2025, but was able to autograph 20 copies of the book from her bedside. She died of cancer on 20 November 2025 in Kuala Lumpur, at the age of 79.

== Publications ==
- The State of Nature Conservation in Malaysia (1991) ISBN 978-983-968-108-6
- Wild Plants of Ha Long Bay [Thực Vật Tự Nhiên ở Vịnh Hạ Long] (2000)
- Singapore Botanic Gardens : A Souvenir Guide (2001) ISBN 978-981-306-548-2
- Begonias of Peninsular Malaysia (2005) ISBN 983-812-086-3
- A Guide to Begonias in Borneo (2015) ISBN 978-983-812-160-6
- Batu Caves: Malaysia's Majestic Limestone Icon (2020) ISBN 978-967-179-661-0
- Flowers of Fraser’s Hill, Peninsular Malaysia (2025) ISBN 978-983-812-221-4
