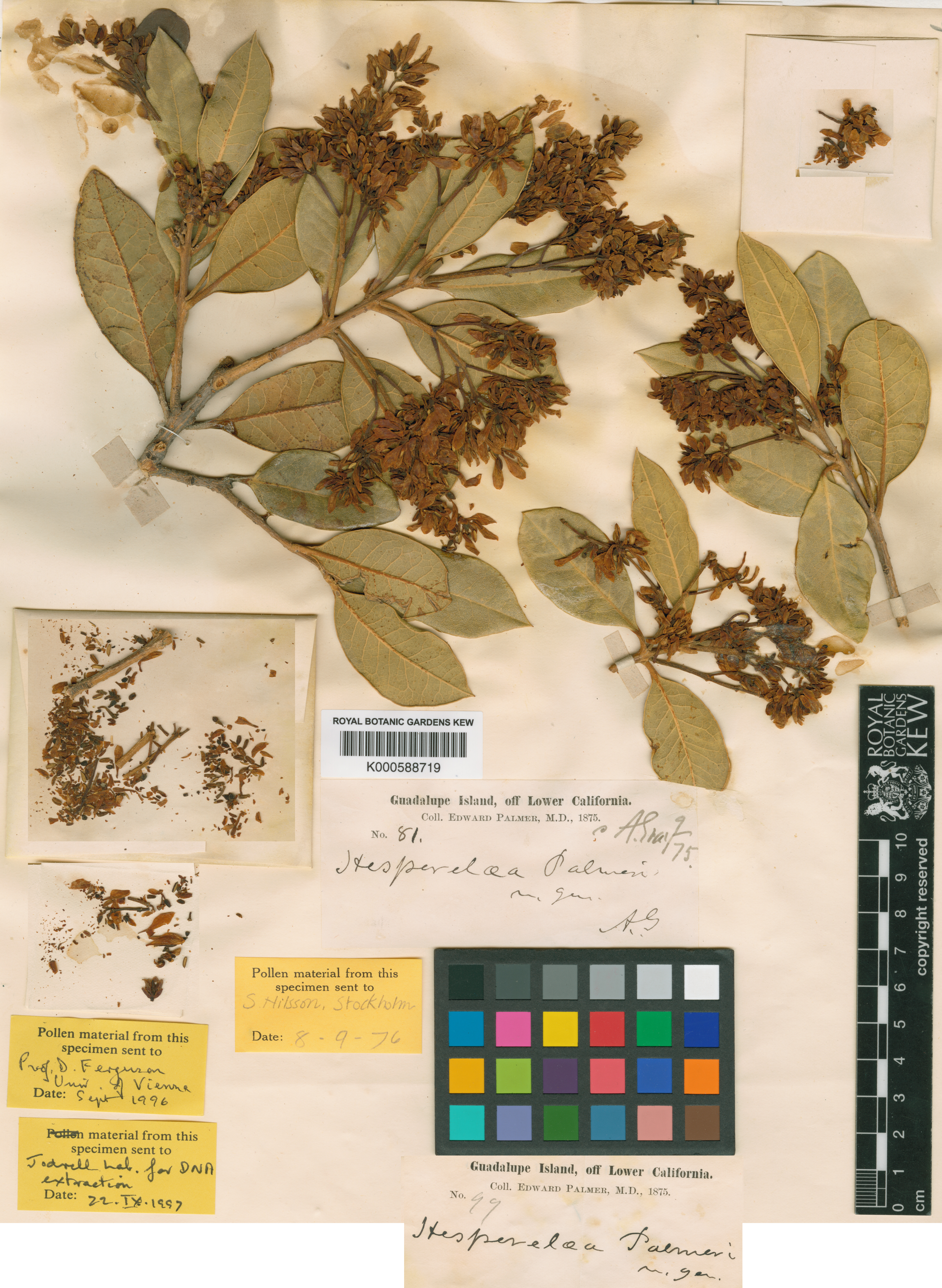
- A specimen of Hesperelaea palmeri collected by Edward Palmer, at Royal Botanic Gardens, Kew.

Conservation status
- Extinct (IUCN 3.1)

Scientific classification
- Kingdom: Plantae
- Clade: Tracheophytes
- Clade: Angiosperms
- Clade: Eudicots
- Clade: Asterids
- Order: Lamiales
- Family: Oleaceae
- Tribe: Oleeae
- Subtribe: Oleinae
- Genus: Hesperelaea; A.Gray
- Species: †H. palmeri

Binomial name
- †Hesperelaea palmeri A.Gray

= Hesperelaea =

Hesperelaea palmeri

Genus of flowering plants in the Oleaceae family

Hesperelaea is a monotypic genus of trees in the olive family which contains the single species Hesperelaea palmeri, now probably extinct. The species was found only on Guadalupe Island, a small island in the Pacific Ocean, part of the Mexican state of Baja California, about 400 km (250 mi) southwest of Ensenada. It was collected once in 1875 by Edward Palmer, who found three living individuals. He remains the only recorded person to have seen the species alive. The small population of the species, the devastating effects of feral goats, and the overexploitation of the island's woody plants likely meant that the species was extinct by the end of the 19th century. An intensive search for the plant in 2000 was unsuccessful.

Hespereleae palmeri was a compact tree or shrub 6.1–7.6 m (20–25 ft) high, with entire, coriaceous (leathery) leaves that were mostly oppositely arranged. The inflorescence was a terminal panicle of perfect (bisexual) 4-parted flowers. The flowers were pale or lemon yellow, the petals over 20 mm (0.79 in) long. Asa Gray considered the species remarkable for the Oleaceae in having wholly distinct petals and uniformly isomerous stamens. The fruit was drupaceous.

At the time of the collection of the type material in 1875, Hesperelaea palmeri was found only in a single tree-covered canyon on the eastern side of the island, where Palmer found three mature living plants among numerous dead ones. Palmer made 11 duplicates of his specimen, which are conserved in eight herbaria, constituting the only known remains of Hesperelaea. In 1900, Townshend Stith Brandegee, searching for the tree, noted that at Palmer's locality he only managed to find a goat corral made from trees chopped down in the vicinity. Hesperelaea was among many species that went extinct on Guadalupe Island by the end of the 19th and early 20th centuries, with at least 26 native plant extinctions or extirpations recorded from the island.

Phylogenetic analyses based on DNA from the nuclear genome as well as mitochondrial and chloroplast DNA suggest that H. palmeri is closely related to the genera Forestiera and Priogymnanthus in tribe Oleeae, and perhaps the sister lineage of Forestiera. A molecular clock analysis estimated its divergence from its closest relatives in the Early Miocene, likely pre-dating the age of Guadalupe Island. This suggests that H. palmeri is a paleoendemic that was once more widespread and then retreated to Guadalupe Island following environmental change.

== See also ==
Other extinctions of endemic species on Guadalupe Island:

- Castilleja guadalupensis
- Pogogyne tenuiflora – also only known from a single specimen collected by Palmer on the same trip.
- Guadalupe caracara
