= P. floribunda =

P. floribunda may refer to:

- Parentucellia floribunda, a parasitic plant
- Pauridiantha floribunda, an afrotropical plant
- Pectis floribunda, an annual plant
- Pentacalia floribunda, a plant endemic to Ecuador
- Pentaphylloides floribunda, a deciduous shrub
- Periploca floribunda, a plant with perfect flowers
- Phacelia floribunda, a phacelia endemic to San Clemente Island
- Phylica floribunda, an African plant
- Phyllodoce floribunda, a perennial evergreen
- Phymosia floribunda, a plant with stems that contain mucous canals
- Physaria floribunda, a perennial herb
- Pieris floribunda, a shrubby bush
- Pilosella floribunda, a vascular plant
- Pinochia floribunda, a plant species native to North America
- Piptadenia floribunda, a tropical legume
- Pleurothallis floribunda, a flowering plant
- Plummera floribunda, a plant with composite flowers
- Pogogyne floribunda, a mint native to northeastern California
- Potentilla floribunda, a deciduous shrub
- Primula floribunda, a herbaceous plant
- Pseuderia floribunda, an Oceanian orchid
