= Priogymnanthus apertus =

Conservation status
- Endangered (IUCN 3.1)

Scientific classification
- Kingdom: Plantae
- Clade: Tracheophytes
- Clade: Angiosperms
- Clade: Eudicots
- Clade: Asterids
- Order: Lamiales
- Family: Oleaceae
- Genus: Priogymnanthus
- Species: P. apertus

Binomial name
- Priogymnanthus apertus (B.Ståhl) P.S.Green

Species of flowering plant

Priogymnanthus apertus is a species of flowering plant in the family Oleaceae. It is endemic to Ecuador.
