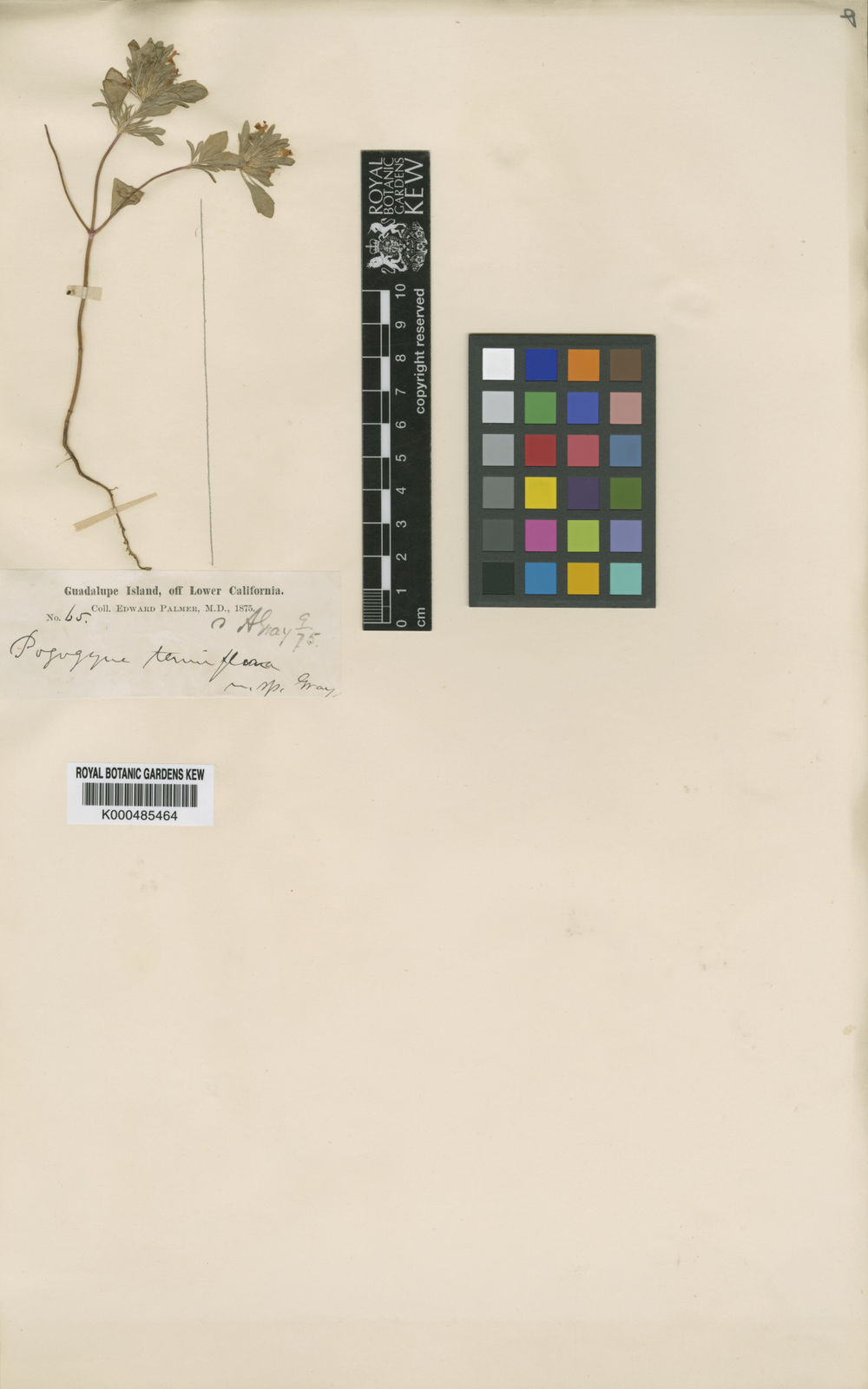
- A specimen of Pogogyne tenuiflora collected by Edward Palmer, at Royal Botanic Gardens, Kew.

Scientific classification
- Kingdom: Plantae
- Clade: Tracheophytes
- Clade: Angiosperms
- Clade: Eudicots
- Clade: Asterids
- Order: Lamiales
- Family: Lamiaceae
- Genus: Pogogyne
- Species: †P. tenuiflora

Binomial name
- †Pogogyne tenuiflora A.Gray

Synonyms
- Hedeomoides tenuiflora (A.Gray) Briq.

= Pogogyne tenuiflora =

Species of flowering plants

Pogogyne tenuiflora is an extinct species of annual plant in the mint family. Endemic to Guadalupe Island in the eastern Pacific, the Guadalupe mesa mint was only known from a single specimen collected by Edward Palmer in 1875. The species was described from Palmer's specimens by Asa Gray in 1876.

Pogogyne tenuiflora is a small, aromatic annual herb, with inflorescences consisting of flowers in bracteate verticils forming dense terminal spikes. The corollas are blue-purple and tubular, with an erect, entire upper lip and a spreading 3-lobed lower lip. The corollas measure 10–14 mm (0.39–0.55 in) long. The lower pair of stamens measure 3–4 mm (0.12–0.16 in) long. The style is bearded for about 3 mm (0.12 in) below the branches. The two sterile upper anthers place this species within the Hedeomoides subgenus of Pogogyne, which was recognized as its own genus by John Isaac Briquet in 1896.

During his visit, Palmer only saw this species very rarely among the sagebrush habitat on the eastern side of the island. By 1875, the feral goats, introduced years before by humans, had already started to devastate the environment of the island, leaving Palmer as the only person to document a number of species on the island that have also gone extinct, like the paleo-endemic monotypic olive relative Hesperelaea palmeri.

Ira Wiggins thought P. tenuiflora to 'probably' be extinct in his 1980 flora of the Baja California peninsula (including Guadalupe Island). Reid Moran considered P. tenuiflora to be 'undoubtedly' extinct in his 1996 treatise on the flora of the island. The San Diego Natural History Museum considers this species as 'likely' extinct. A 2013 phylogenetic study of the genus considers the species to be presumed extinct.

== See also ==
Other extinctions of endemic species on Guadalupe Island:

- Castilleja guadalupensis
- Hesperelaea
- Guadalupe caracara
