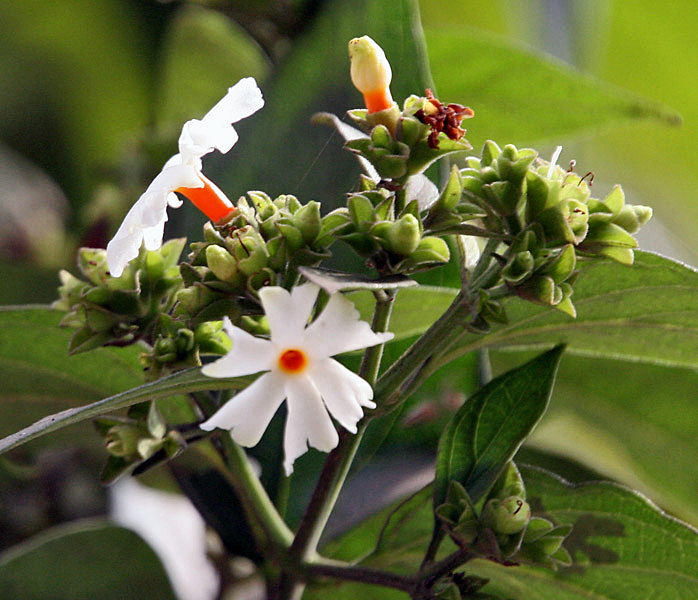
- Nyctanthes arbor-tristis

Scientific classification
- Kingdom: Plantae
- Clade: Tracheophytes
- Clade: Angiosperms
- Clade: Eudicots
- Clade: Asterids
- Order: Lamiales
- Family: Oleaceae
- Tribe: Myxopyreae

Genera
- Dimetra; Myxopyrum; Nyctanthes

= Myxopyreae =

Tribe of flowering plants

Myxopyreae is a tribe of flowering plants in the olive family, Oleaceae.

== Genera ==
- Dimetra Kerr
- Myxopyrum Blume
- Nyctanthes L.
