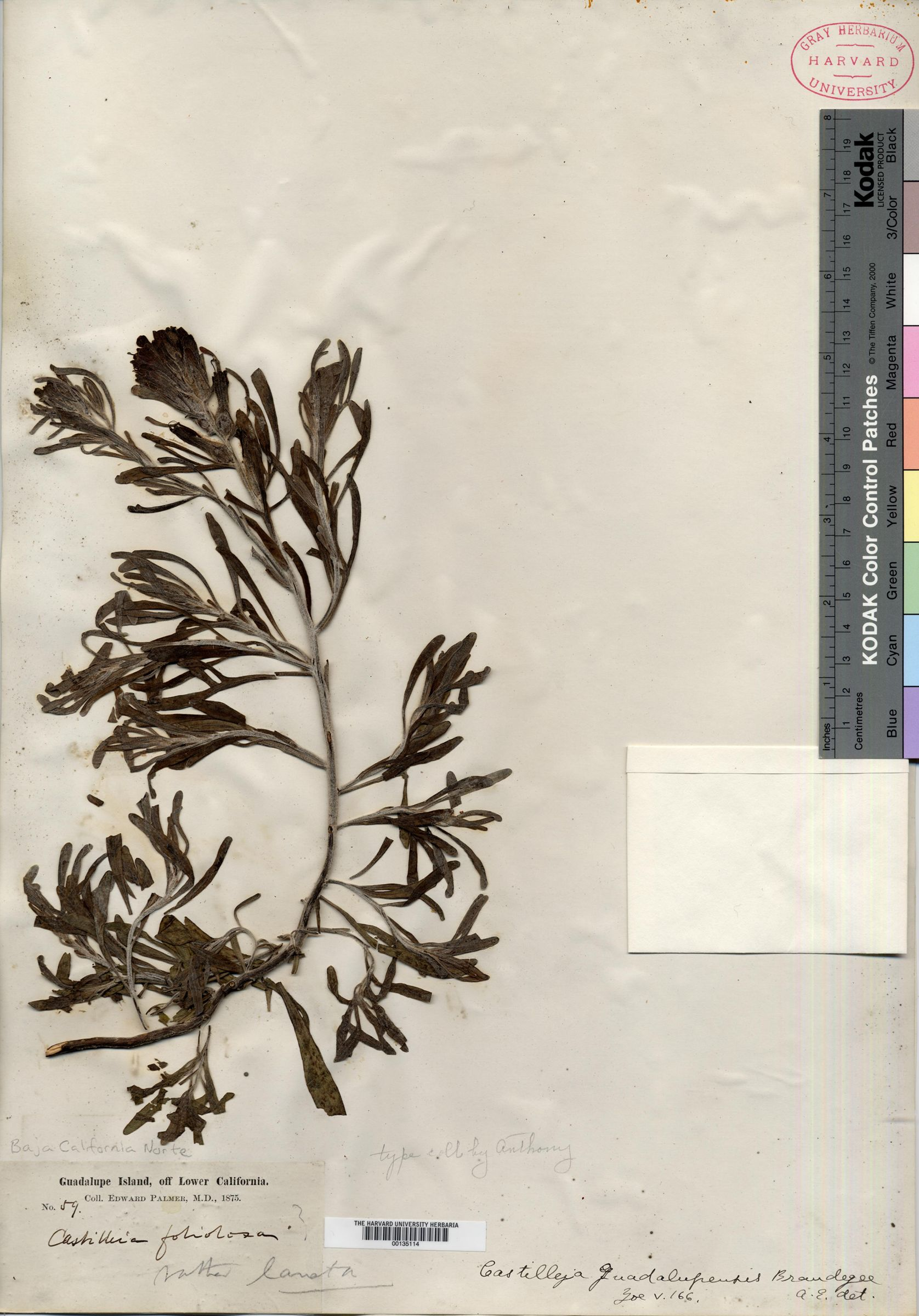
- One specimen of Castilleja guadalupensis collected by Edward Palmer, deposited at Harvard University

Scientific classification
- Kingdom: Plantae
- Clade: Tracheophytes
- Clade: Angiosperms
- Clade: Eudicots
- Clade: Asterids
- Order: Lamiales
- Family: Orobanchaceae
- Genus: Castilleja
- Species: †C. guadalupensis

Binomial name
- †Castilleja guadalupensis Brandegee

= Castilleja guadalupensis =

Extinct species of flowering plant

Castilleja guadalupensis is an extinct species of plant in the broomrape family Orobanchaceae commonly known as the Guadalupe paintbrush. The plant was only found on the central and northern portions of Guadalupe Island, an eastern Pacific island of Mexico. It was one of two endemic species of Castilleja to the island, the other, Castilleja fruticosa, mainly surviving on offshore islets.

Castilleja guadalupensis was first found by Edward Palmer on the middle of Guadalupe in 1875, although the plants were initially recognized as Castilleja foliolosa. The type specimen was later collected by ornithologist Alfred Webster Anthony on a March 1897 expedition to Guadalupe with Townshend Stith Brandegee. A year later in 1898, sailor and hunter Harry Drent collected some specimens of C. guadalupensis. The species has not been found since and is presumably extinct due to the overgrazing of the island by introduced feral goats.

Brandegee described the species in 1903. Castilleja guadalupensis is close in appearance to C. foliolosa, which Palmer's specimens were initially labeled as, but C. guadalupensis is a much-branched shrub to 6 decimetres (24 in) tall with smooth hard, woody stems at the base, while C. foliolosa has herbaceous stems with a tomentose, white indumentum.

== See also ==
Other extinctions of endemic species on Guadalupe Island:

- Pogogyne tenuiflora
- Hesperelaea
- Guadalupe caracara
