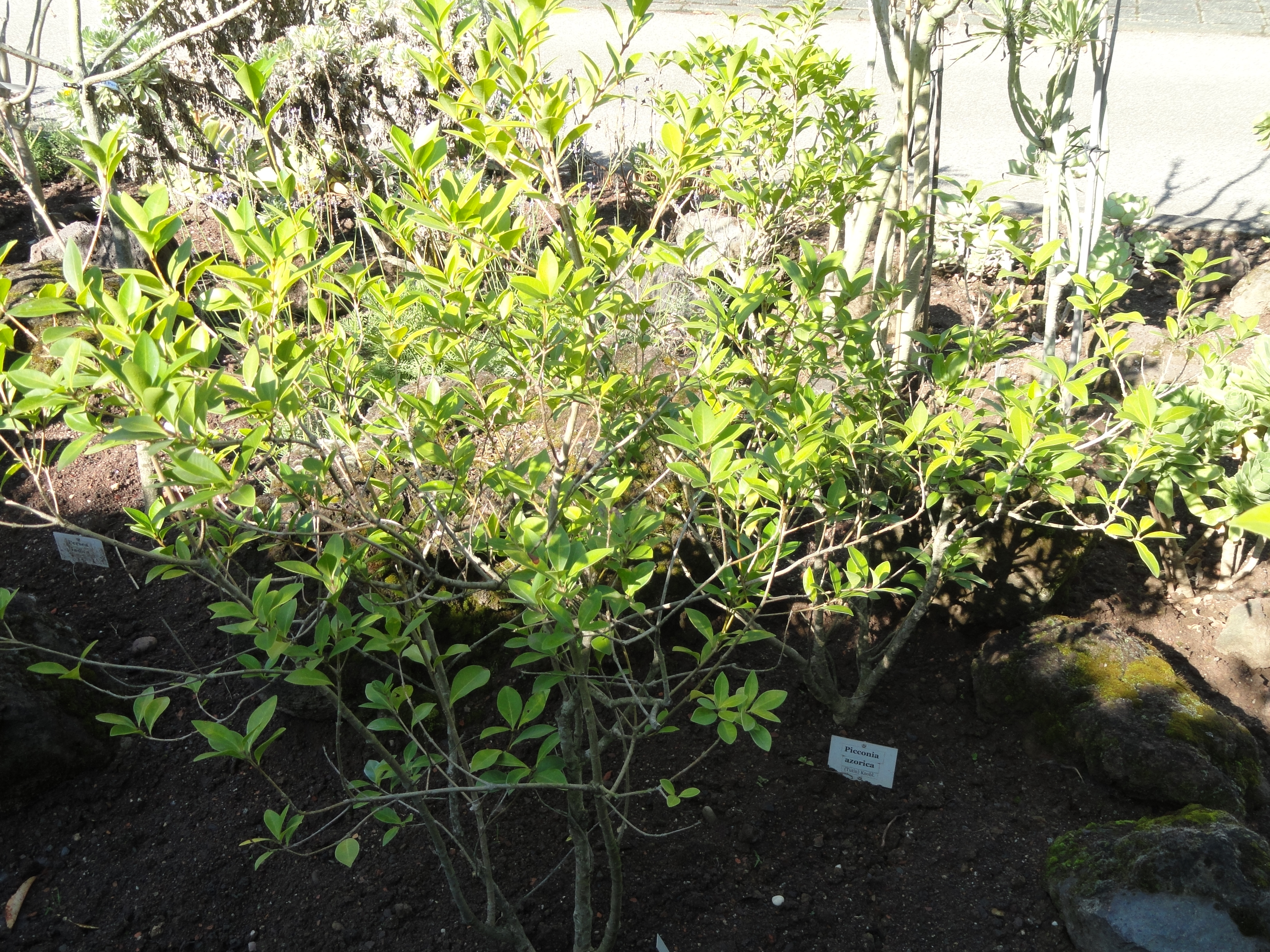

Conservation status
- Least Concern (IUCN 3.1)

Scientific classification
- Kingdom: Plantae
- Clade: Tracheophytes
- Clade: Angiosperms
- Clade: Eudicots
- Clade: Asterids
- Order: Lamiales
- Family: Oleaceae
- Genus: Picconia
- Species: P. azorica

Binomial name
- Picconia azorica (Tutin) Knobl.

= Picconia azorica =

Species of flowering plant

Picconia azorica, locally known as pau-branco, is a species of Picconia common to the majority of islands of the Portuguese archipelago of the Azores, where it is endemic. It can grow to a medium-sized tree, though it is usually found in the form of a shrub. It is threatened by habitat loss.

== Description ==
The evergreen woody plant species is present in all the islands of the Azores, except Graciosa, usually in coastal and medium altitude forests from sea-level up to about 700 m (2,300 ft) high. Leaves are lanceolate or ovate, opposite and with entire margins. It flowers from March to July, producing small white flowers in axillary clusters. The fleshy fruits are dark blue drupes about 1.5 centimetres (0.59 in) long, similar to olive trees (both plants are in the Oleaceae family).

== Status ==
The species is very popular in traditional/artesnal carpentry, for furniture construction and religious sanctuary.

Since its colonization, the resources of the different islands of the Azores were used to sustain its population. This meant that the forests were also cut-down to support the local economy and day-to-day activities, and other non-endemic species planted to support growing populations, such as the Cryptomeria (Cryptomeria japonica) and the Acacia (Acacia dealbata) (which were quick growing in the habitats of the islands).

Overexploitation of the wood led to the species becoming almost extinct in some islands. It has become a priority for re-population and conservation, listed as endangered on the IUCN Red List 2004, and Annex II of the Habitats Directive (Berne Convention on the Conservation of European Wildlife and Natural Habitats), due to habitat degradation, expansion of agricultural land, forestation, competition by invader species and isolation of populations.
