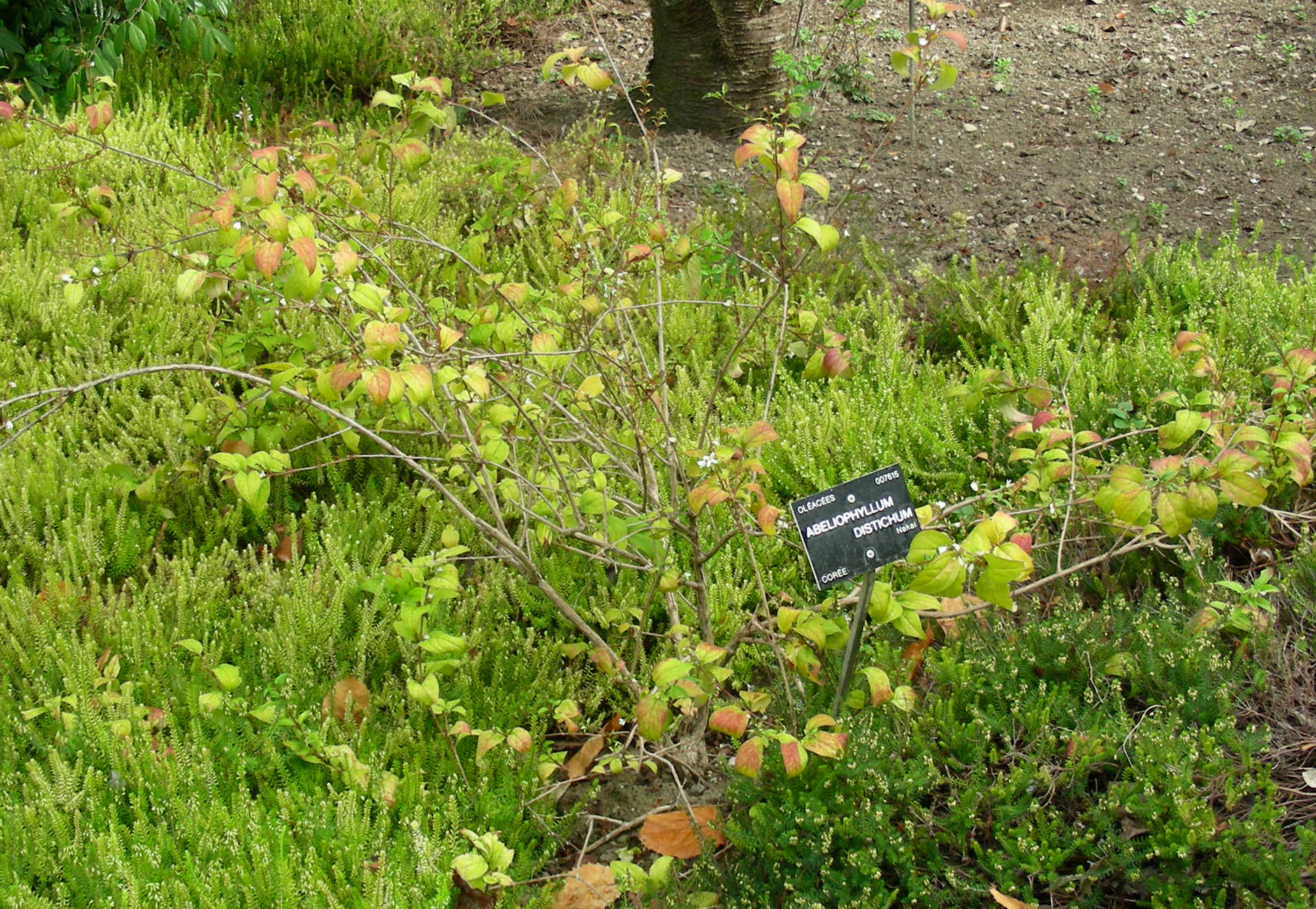

Conservation status
- Endangered (IUCN 3.1)

Scientific classification
- Kingdom: Plantae
- Clade: Tracheophytes
- Clade: Angiosperms
- Clade: Eudicots
- Clade: Asterids
- Order: Lamiales
- Family: Oleaceae
- Tribe: Forsythieae
- Genus: Abeliophyllum; Nakai
- Species: A. distichum

Binomial name
- Abeliophyllum distichum Nakai
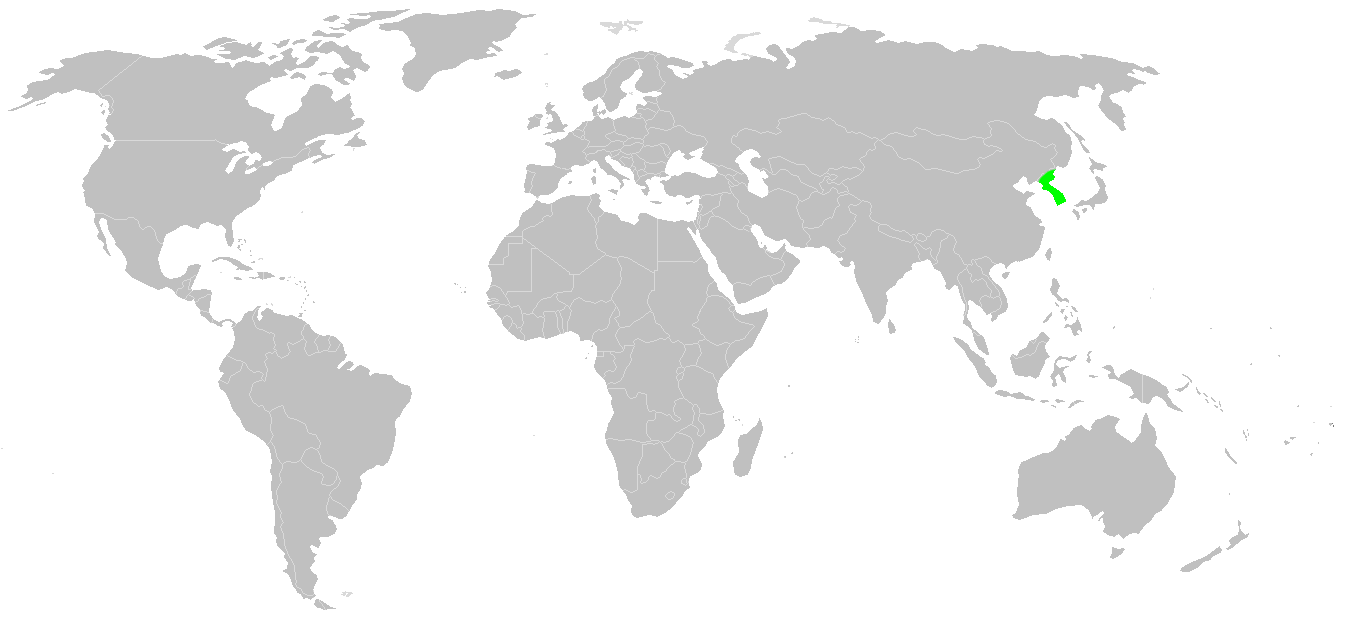

= Abeliophyllum =

Genus of flowering plants

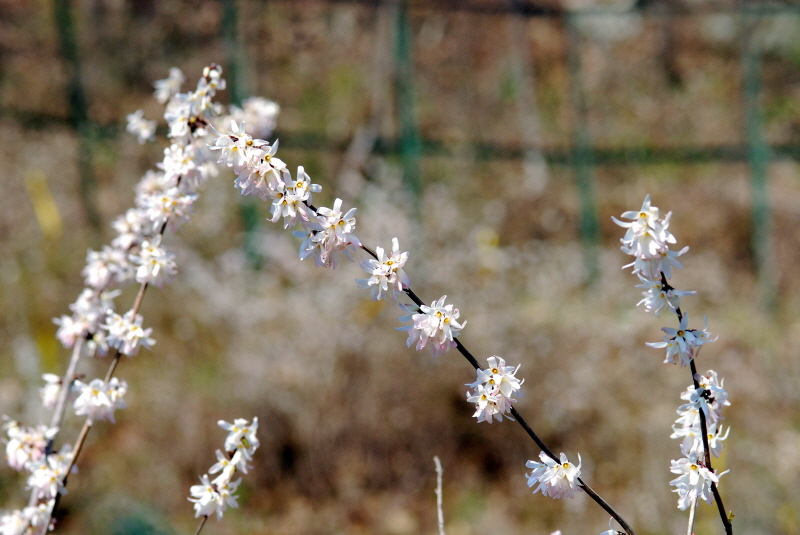
flowering in Goesan Chujeom-ri Misennamu Habitat

Abeliophyllum, the miseonnamu, Korean abeliophyllum, white forsythia, or Korean abelialeaf, is a monotypic genus of flowering plants in the olive family, Oleaceae. It consists of one species, Abeliophyllum distichum Nakai, endemic to Korea, where it is endangered in the wild, occurring at only seven sites. It is related to Forsythia, but differs in having white, not yellow, flowers.

== Description ==
It is a deciduous shrub growing to 1–1.5 m (3 ft 3 in – 4 ft 11 in) tall and rounded in outline with multi-stemmed and arching branches. The leaves are opposite, simple, 5–9 cm (2–4 in) long and 3–4.5 cm (1–2 in) wide, pubescent both above and below. The flowers are produced in early spring before the new leaves appear; they are white or pink tinged, and fragrant, about 1–1.5 cm (0–1 in) in diameter, with a four-lobed corolla. The fruit is a round, winged samara 2–3 cm (1–1 in) diameter. Almost looking like an elm tree fruit.

It is cultivated as an ornamental plant in Europe and North America. Hardy to USDA Zone 4.

== Taxonomy ==
The genus name of Abeliophyllum is in honour of Clarke Abel (1780–1826), a British surgeon and naturalist. With the latin suffix of 'phyllum' meaning leaf. The Latin specific epithet of distichum means in two ranks, referring to the leaves. It was first described and published in Bot. Mag. (Tokyo) Vol.33 on page 153 in 1919.

== Conservation status ==
In 1998, a review of the plant's conservation status found that "it is close to extinction and qualifies for the IUCN Category of 'Critically Endangered', indicating a high risk of extinction in the near future."; but as of 2009 it has not yet been formally assessed for the IUCN Red List.

In 2015, IUCN classed the species as endangered.
