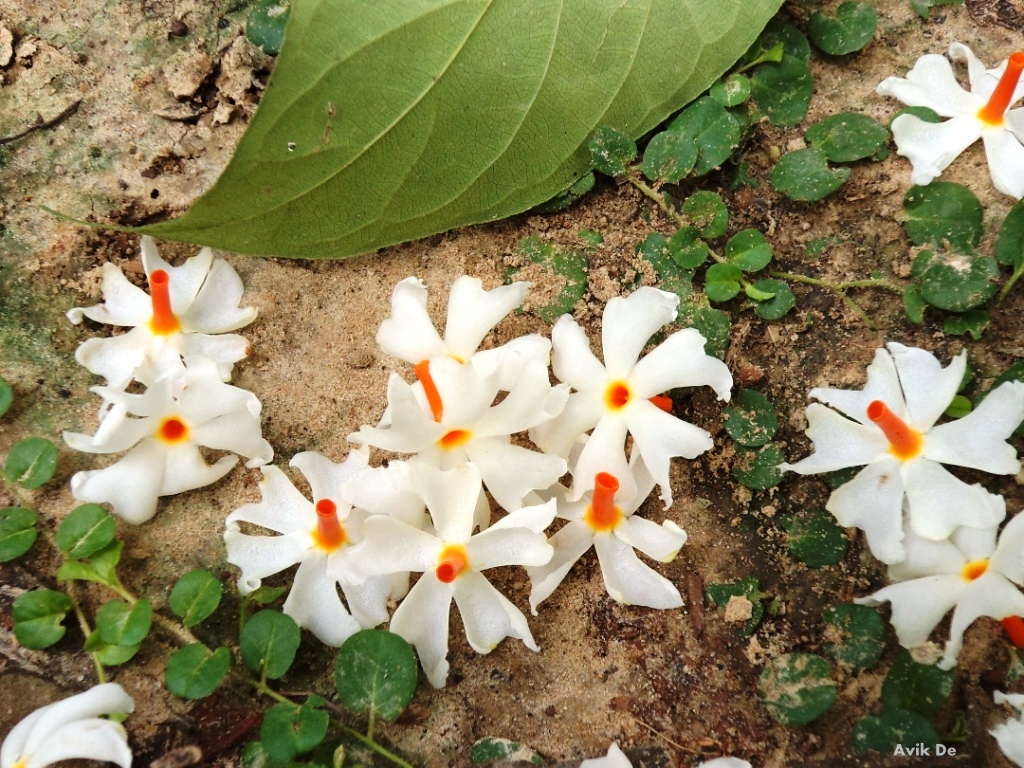

Conservation status
- Least Concern (IUCN 3.1)

Scientific classification
- Kingdom: Plantae
- Clade: Tracheophytes
- Clade: Angiosperms
- Clade: Eudicots
- Clade: Asterids
- Order: Lamiales
- Family: Oleaceae
- Genus: Nyctanthes
- Species: N. arbor-tristis

Binomial name
- Nyctanthes arbor-tristis L.

Synonyms
- Bruschia macrocarpa Bertol.; Nyctanthes dentata Blume; Nyctanthes tristis Salisb.; Parilium arbor-tristis (L.) Gaertn.; Scabrita scabra L.; Scabrita triflora L.

= Nyctanthes arbor-tristis =

Species of plant

Nyctanthes arbor-tristis is a species of Nyctanthes native to South Asia and Southeast Asia. It is commonly known as night-blooming jasmine, tree of sadness, tree of sorrow, hengra bubar, coral jasmine, as seri gading in Singapore and as shiuli in the Bengal region. Despite its common name, the species is not a "true jasmine" and not of the genus Jasminum.

== Names ==
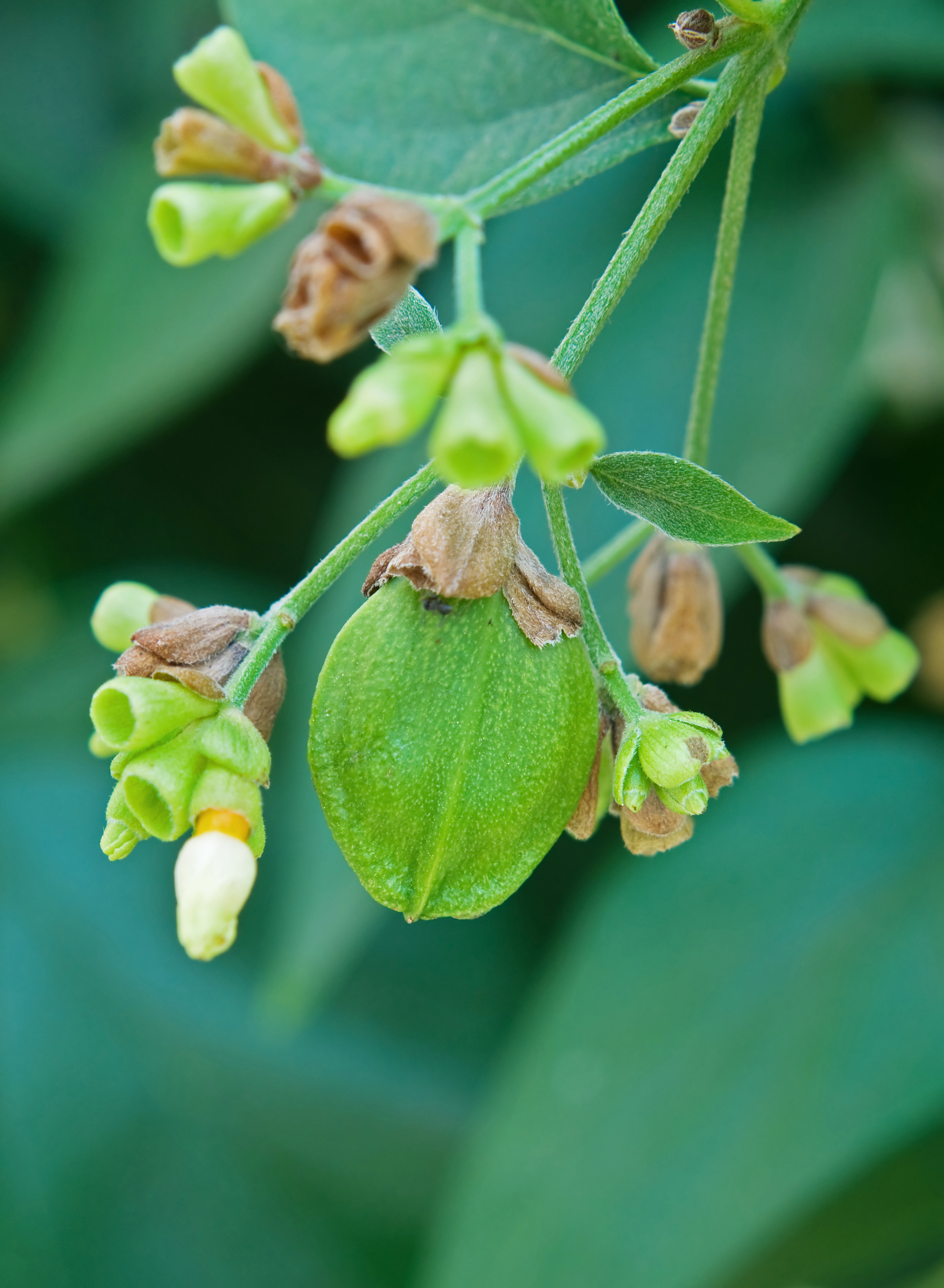
Fruit in Bardhaman, West Bengal, India

The tree is called the "tree of sorrow" because the foliage becomes droopy as blooming flowers fall off during early morning. The Latin specific epithet arbor-tristis means "sad tree". In India and Nepal, Nyctanthes arbor-tristis is known as pārijāta (पारिजात). In other Indian languages, it is known as sephalika (Sanskrit), pavalamallikai (Tamil), parijata (Kannada), pavizamalli (Malayalam), and siharu. In Malaysia it is known as seri gading and in China it is referred to as nai hua or hung mo li.

== Description ==
Nyctanthes arbor-tristis is a shrub or a small tree growing to 10 m (33 ft) tall, with flaky grey bark. The leaves are opposite, simple, 6–12 cm (2.4–4.7 in) long and 2–6.5 cm (0.79–2.56 in) broad, with an entire margin. The flowers are fragrant, with a five- to eight-lobed white corolla with an orange-red centre; they are produced in clusters of two to seven together, with individual flowers opening at dusk and finishing at dawn. The fruit is a bilobed, flat brown heart-shaped to round capsule 2 cm (0.79 in) diameter, each lobe containing a single seed.

== Distribution and habitat ==
N. arbor-tristis is native to Indo-China, Himalaya and Sumatera to Jawa. It grows in dry deciduous forests and hillsides.

== Uses ==
The leaves have been used in Ayurvedic medicine and Homoeopathy for sciatica, arthritis, and fevers, and as a laxative. An orange dye from the corolla, nyctanthin, is used to dye silk. In India, flowers are used to make garlands and used for worship.

== Culture ==
The flower of Nyctanthes arbor-tristis is the official state flower of the Indian state of West Bengal and is called shiuli or shephali in Bengali. The shiuli (Bengali: শিউলি) flowers bloom during the autumn season in Bengal and are offered to the goddess Durga at the festival of Durga Puja. Many Durga Puja songs and poems mention the flower.

The native people of the Indian state of Tripura use the plant to help predict weather and rainfall.

== Literature ==
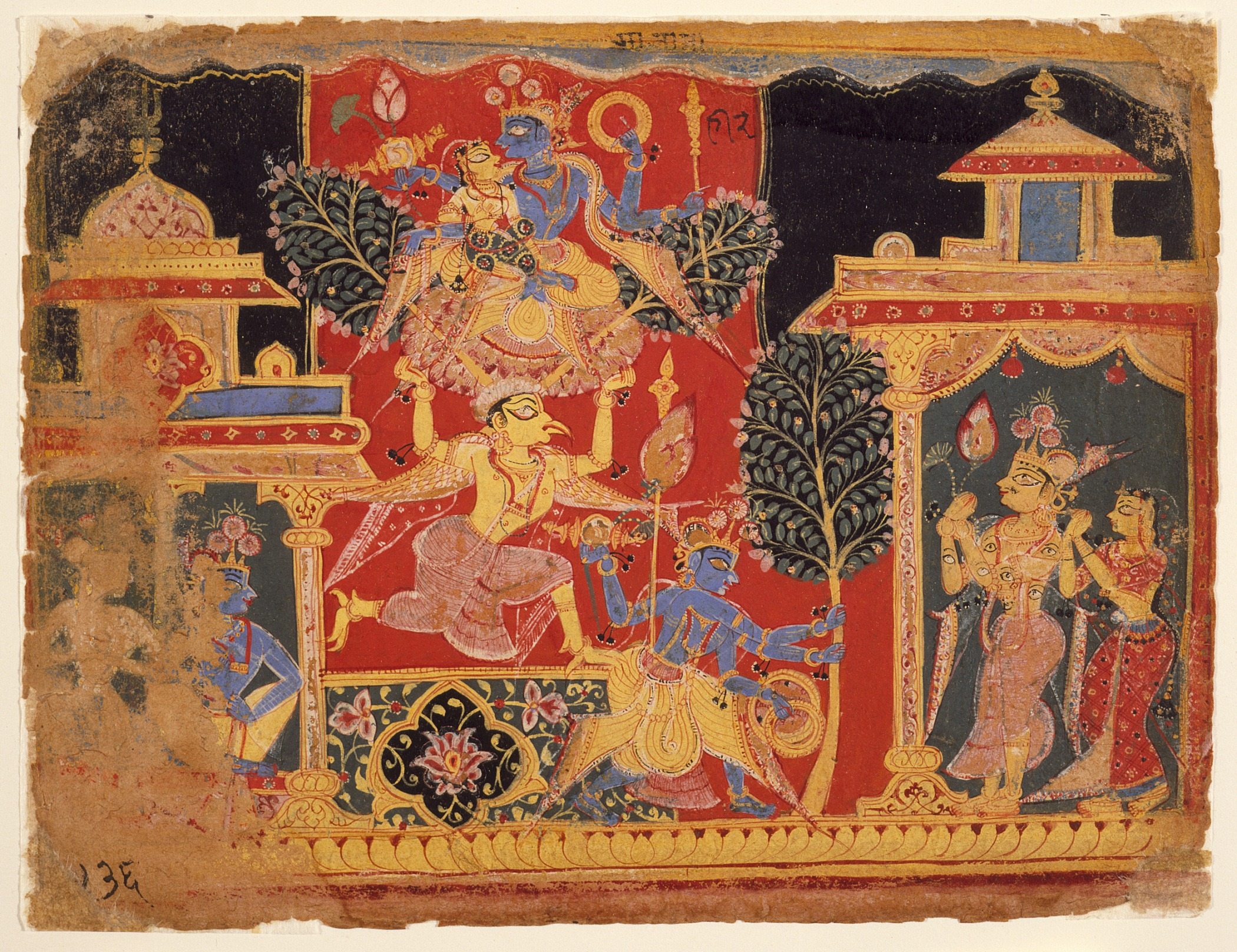
"Krishna Uproots the Parijata Tree", manuscript from a Bhagavata Purana

The parijata is a divine tree featured in Hindu history. The Mahabharata and the Puranas describe the parijata tree, as one of five trees, to have emerged during the legend of the Samudra Manthana. Krishna is described to have battled with Indra to uproot the parijata from his capital of Amaravati and plant it in his own city of Dvaraka. In regional tradition, Satyabhama grew aggrieved when Krishna offered his chief consort Rukmini a parijata flower. To placate her envy, Krishna confronted Indra and had the parijata tree planted near Satyabhama's door. Despite having the tree planted near her dwelling, the flowers of the tree fell in the adjacent backyard of Rukmini, the favourite wife of Krishna, because of her superior devotion and humility.

The tree is the subject of a work named Parijatapaharanamu in Telugu literature, written by Nandi Thimmana, the court-poet of Krishnadevaraya. The poet Kalidasa sings about the flower in his Sanskrit poem Ritu samhara.

== See also ==
- Jasminum sambac
- Tabernaemontana divaricata
- Trachelospermum jasminoides
