= Haenianthus =

Scientific classification
- Kingdom: Plantae
- Clade: Tracheophytes
- Clade: Angiosperms
- Clade: Eudicots
- Clade: Asterids
- Order: Lamiales
- Family: Oleaceae
- Tribe: Oleeae
- Subtribe: Oleinae
- Genus: Haenianthus; Griseb.

Genus of flowering plants

Haenianthus is a genus of flowering plant in the family Oleaceae. It is native to the Greater Antilles of the Caribbean. It contains 3 species:

1. Haenianthus incrassatus (Sw.) Griseb. - Jamaica
2. Haenianthus salicifolius Griseb. - Cuba, Hispaniola, Puerto Rico
3. Haenianthus variifolius Urb. - Cuba
