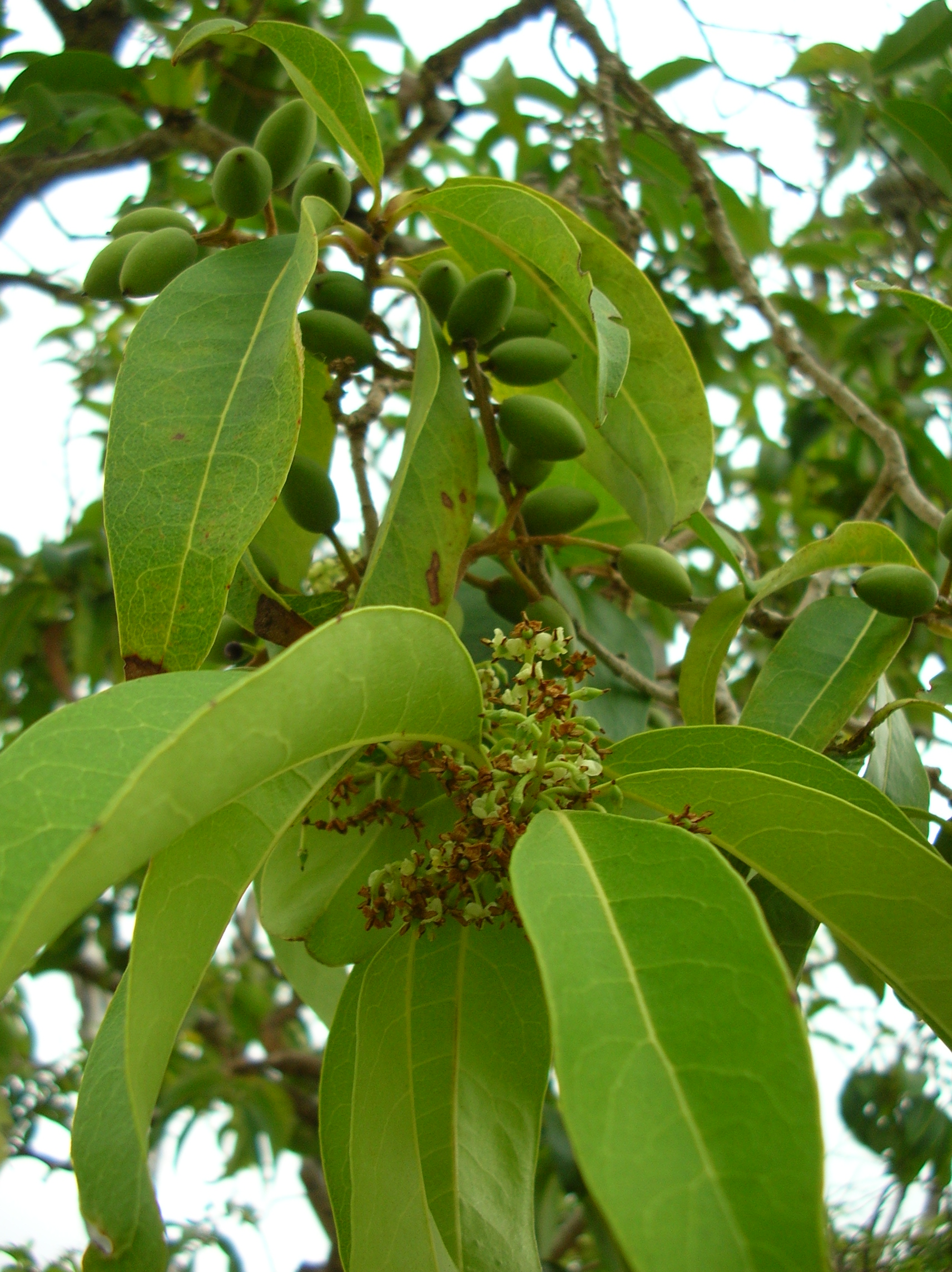
- Nestegis sandwicensis

Scientific classification
- Kingdom: Plantae
- Clade: Tracheophytes
- Clade: Angiosperms
- Clade: Eudicots
- Clade: Asterids
- Order: Lamiales
- Family: Oleaceae
- Tribe: Oleeae

Genera
- See text

= Oleeae =

Tribe of flowering plants

Oleeae is a tribe of flowering plants in the olive family, Oleaceae.

== Genera ==
- Cartrema Raf.
- Chengiodendron C.B.Shang, X.R.Wang, Yi F.Duan & Yong F.Li
- Chionanthus L. – Fringetrees
- Comoranthus Knobl.
- Forestiera Poir. – Swampprivets
- Fraxinus L. – Ash trees
- Haenianthus Griseb.
- Hesperelaea A.Gray
- Ligustrum L. – Privets
- Nestegis Raf.
- Noronhia Stadtm. ex Thouars
- Notelaea Vent.
- Olea L. – Olives
- Osmanthus Lour.
- Phillyrea L.
- Picconia DC.
- Priogymnanthus P.S.Green
- Schrebera Roxb.
- Syringa L. – Lilacs
- Tessarandra Miers
