= Chengiodendron =

Scientific classification
- Kingdom: Plantae
- Clade: Tracheophytes
- Clade: Angiosperms
- Clade: Eudicots
- Clade: Asterids
- Order: Lamiales
- Family: Oleaceae
- Tribe: Oleeae
- Subtribe: Oleinae
- Genus: Chengiodendron; C.B.Shang, X.R.Wang, Yi F.Duan & Yong F.Li (2020)

Species
- Chengiodendron marginatum (Champ. ex Benth.) C.B.Shang, X.R.Wang, Yi F.Duan & Yong F.Li; Chengiodendron matsumuranum (Hayata) C.B.Shang, X.R.Wang, Yi F.Duan & Yong F.Li; Chengiodendron minor (P.S.Green) C.B.Shang, X.R.Wang, Yi F.Duan & Yong F.Li

Genus of plants

Chengiodendron is a genus of flowering plants in the olive family, Oleaceae. It includes three species native to Indochina, southern China including Taiwan and Hainan, the Ryukyu Islands, and Assam.

- Chengiodendron marginatum (Champ. ex Benth.) C.B.Shang, X.R.Wang, Yi F.Duan & Yong F.Li
- Chengiodendron matsumuranum (Hayata) C.B.Shang, X.R.Wang, Yi F.Duan & Yong F.Li
- Chengiodendron minor (P.S.Green) C.B.Shang, X.R.Wang, Yi F.Duan & Yong F.Li

These species were previously included in the Leiolea clade of genus Osmanthus as Osmanthus marginatus, O. matsumuranus, and O. minor. A phylogenetic study revealed that they were paraphyletic to the rest of the genus, and they were placed in the new genus Chengiodendron.
