= Malperia =

Scientific classification
- Kingdom: Plantae
- Clade: Tracheophytes
- Clade: Angiosperms
- Clade: Eudicots
- Clade: Asterids
- Order: Asterales
- Family: Asteraceae
- Subfamily: Asteroideae
- Tribe: Eupatorieae
- Genus: Malperia; S.Watson
- Species: M. tenuis

Binomial name
- Malperia tenuis S.Watson

Synonyms
- Hofmeisteria tenuis (S.Wats.) I.M.Johnst.

Genus of flowering plants

Malperia is a North American plant genus in the tribe Eupatorieae within the family Asteraceae.

There is only one known species, Malperia tenuis. This plant's common name is brown turbans or brownturbans. It is a rare plant native to the Sonoran Desert of the U.S. state of California (Imperial and San Diego Counties) and northwestern Mexico (Sonora, Baja California, Baja California Sur). This is a small annual with white or pinkish bell-shaped flowers.

The name Malperia is based on an anagram of the last name of botanist Edward Palmer.
