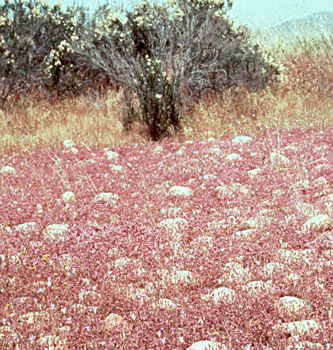
- San Diego mesa mint (P. abramsii) at the vernal pools of San Diego National Wildlife Refuge

Scientific classification
- Kingdom: Plantae
- Clade: Tracheophytes
- Clade: Angiosperms
- Clade: Eudicots
- Clade: Asterids
- Order: Lamiales
- Family: Lamiaceae
- Subfamily: Nepetoideae
- Tribe: Mentheae
- Genus: Pogogyne; Benth.

Synonyms
- Hedeomoides Briq.

= Pogogyne =

Genus of flowering plants

Pogogyne is a small genus of flowering plants in the mint family known generally as mesamints or mesa mints. They are native to Oregon, Idaho, California, and Baja California.

These are small annual plants with glandular, aromatic foliage. They are somewhat variable in appearance but are mostly minty-scented herbs with leaves and flower inflorescences bordered with stiff hairs. The flowers are white or a shade of purple or pinkish-lavender. The best known species is the critically endangered vernal pool species San Diego mesa mint, P. abramsii, which is now found only in a few isolated patches of ground near San Diego, California.

Species

1. Pogogyne abramsii Howell - San Diego mesa mint - San Diego County
2. Pogogyne clareana J.T.Howell - Santa Lucia mesa mint - Monterey County
3. Pogogyne douglasii Benth. - Douglas' mesa mint - Central + Northern California (Coast Ranges + Central Valley)
4. Pogogyne floribunda Jokerst - profuseflower mesa mint - northern California, southern Oregon, southwestern Idaho
5. Pogogyne nudiuscula A.Gray - Otay mesa mint - San Diego County + northern Baja California
6. Pogogyne serpylloides (Torr.) A.Gray - thymeleaf mesa mint - California + Baja California
7. Pogogyne tenuiflora A.Gray - Guadalupe mesa mint - Guadalupe Island
8. Pogogyne zizyphoroides Benth. - Sacramento mesa mint - northern + central California, southwestern Oregon
