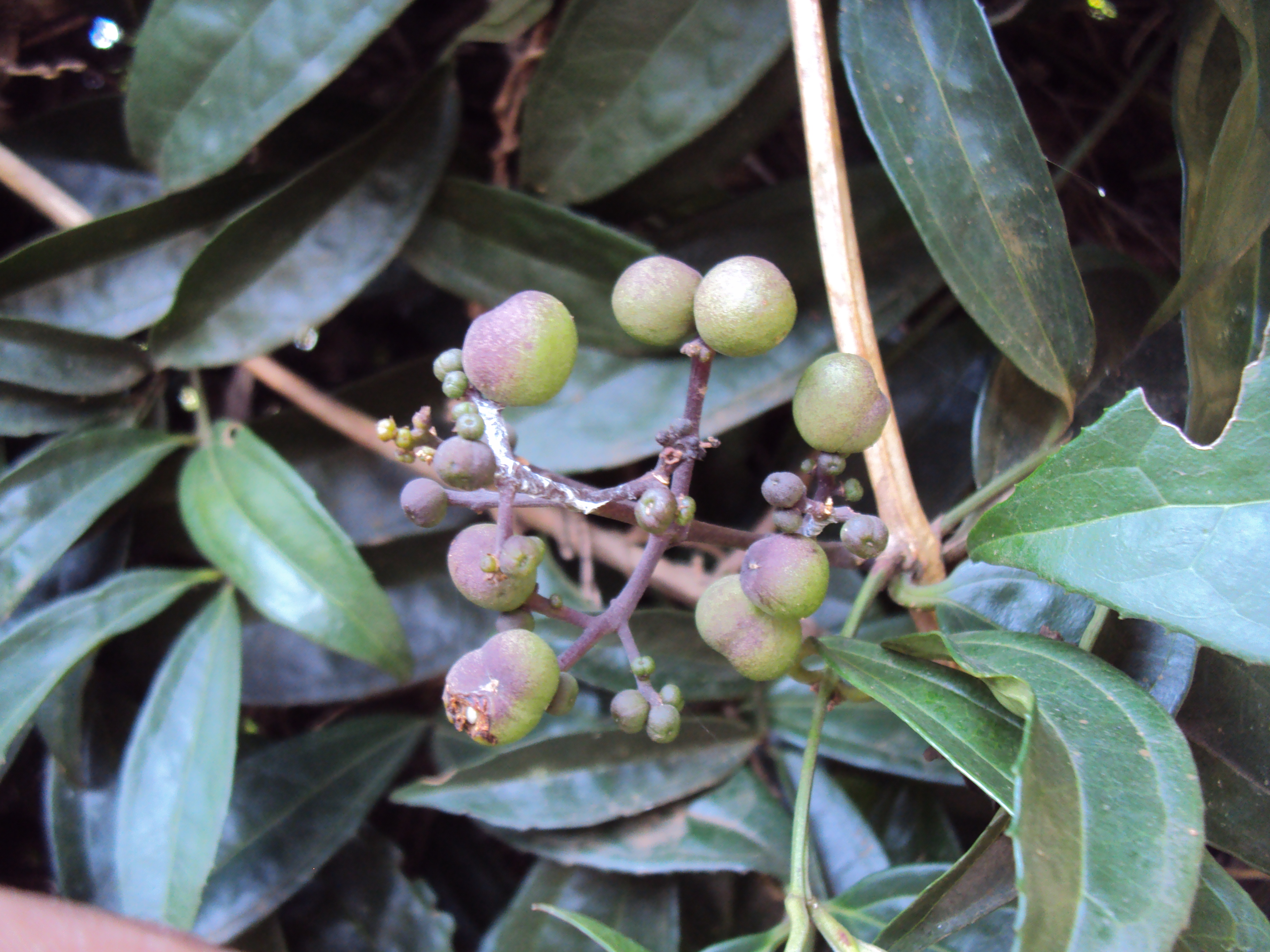
- Myxopyrum smilacifolium

Scientific classification
- Kingdom: Plantae
- Clade: Tracheophytes
- Clade: Angiosperms
- Clade: Eudicots
- Clade: Asterids
- Order: Lamiales
- Family: Oleaceae
- Tribe: Myxopyreae
- Genus: Myxopyrum; Blume

Species
- 4 species; see text.

= Myxopyrum =

Genus of flowering plants

Myxopyrum is a plant genus native to India, southern China, Southeast Asia and New Guinea. There are at present (as of April 2014) 4 recognized species:

- Myxopyrum nervosum Blume - Borneo, Java, Malaysia, Maluku, Sulawesi, Sumatra, New Guinea
  - subsp. coriaceum (Blume) Kiew - Borneo
  - subsp. nervosum
- Myxopyrum ovatum A.W.Hill - Maluku, the Philippines, New Guinea, Bismarck Archipelago
- Myxopyrum pierrei Gagnep. in H.Lecomte - Hainan, Vietnam, Cambodia, Thailand, Borneo
- Myxopyrum smilacifolium (Wall.) Blume - Hainan, Bangladesh, Cambodia, India, Assam, Laos, Myanmar, Thailand, Vietnam, Andaman & Nicobar Islands
  - subsp. confertum (Kerr) P.S.Green - Laos, Thailand, Vietnam
  - subsp. smilacifolium - Hainan, Assam, Bangladesh, India, Andaman & Nicobar Islands, Myanmar, Thailand, Vietnam
