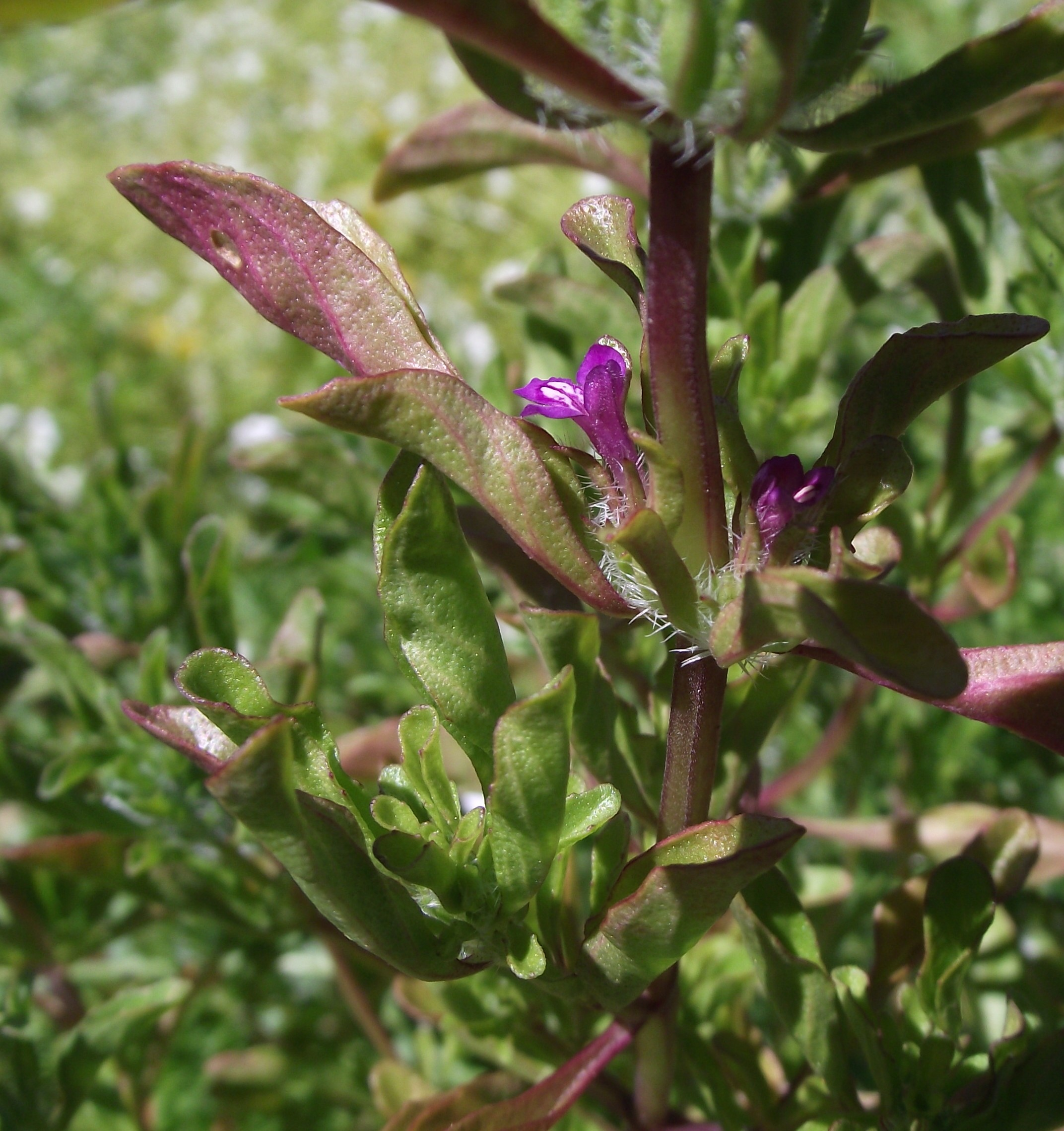

Scientific classification
- Kingdom: Plantae
- Clade: Tracheophytes
- Clade: Angiosperms
- Clade: Eudicots
- Clade: Asterids
- Order: Lamiales
- Family: Lamiaceae
- Genus: Pogogyne
- Species: P. douglasii

Binomial name
- Pogogyne douglasii Benth.

= Pogogyne douglasii =

Species of flowering plant

Pogogyne douglasii is a species of flowering plant in the mint family known by the common names Douglas' mesamint and Douglas' beardstyle.

The plant is endemic to central California, where it grows in vernal pools and similar grassland habitats in the coastal and interior California Coast Ranges, Sierra Nevada foothills, and the Central Valley.

== Description ==
Pogogyne douglasii is an aromatic annual herb producing a sturdy, erect stem up to about 40 centimeters in maximum height.

The inflorescence is a headlike cluster, each flower accompanied by long, pointed sepals lined densely with long, straight, white hairs. Each lipped tubular flower is 1 to 2 centimeters in length and mostly pinkish-purple with a white throat spotted with purple and sometimes yellow.
