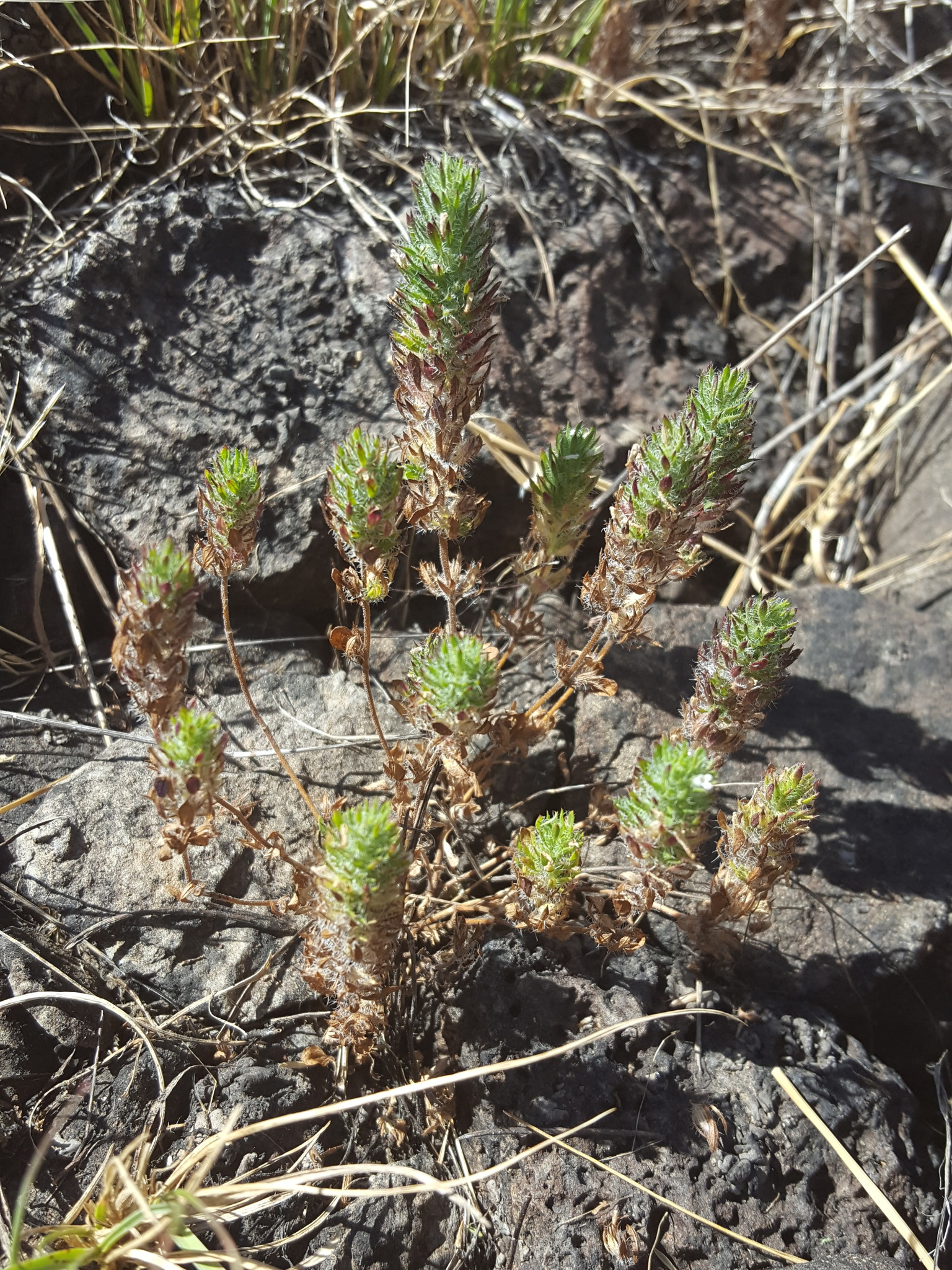
- Pogogyne floribunda

Scientific classification
- Kingdom: Plantae
- Clade: Tracheophytes
- Clade: Angiosperms
- Clade: Eudicots
- Clade: Asterids
- Order: Lamiales
- Family: Lamiaceae
- Genus: Pogogyne
- Species: P. floribunda

Binomial name
- Pogogyne floribunda Jokerst

= Pogogyne floribunda =

Species of flowering plant

Pogogyne floribunda is a species of flowering plant in the mint family known by the common names profuseflower mesamint and profuse-flowered pogogyne. It is native to the Modoc Plateau and surrounding basin habitat in the northeastern corner of California. It is known from six occurrences in adjacent Oregon and one in Idaho. It can be found in vernal pools, ephemeral creeks, and other summer-dry water bodies on the plateau. This is an aromatic annual herb producing a mostly erect, branching stem which is lined nearly from base to top with inflorescence. The lipped, tubular flowers are about half a centimeter long and white in color. Most have purple spots or red speckles, while a few are pure white or solid pale purple. Each is surrounded by a calyx of pointed sepals which are coated in long white hairs.

This plant, once thought to be a variety of the more common Pogogyne zizyphoroides, was elevated to species level in 1992.
