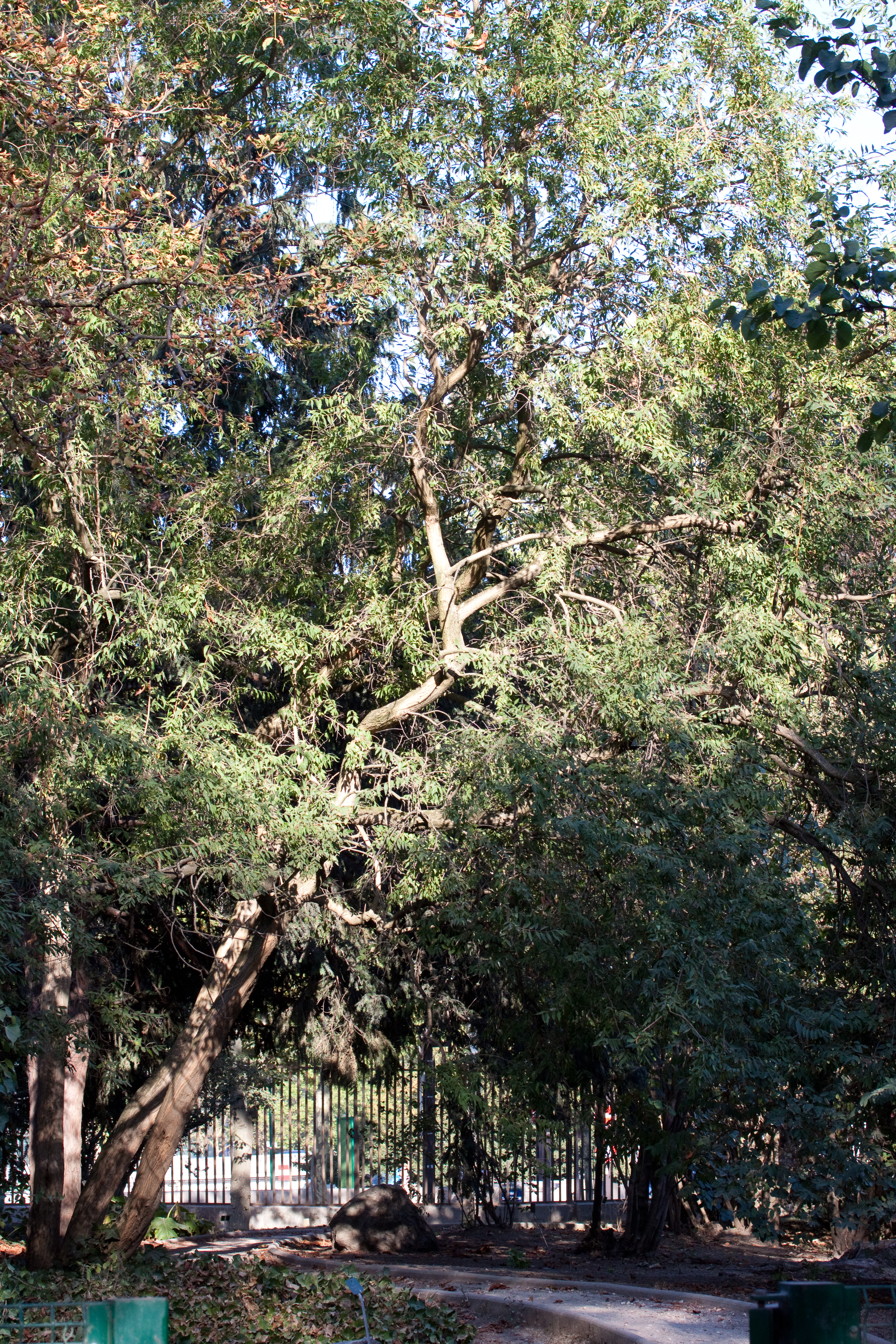

Scientific classification
- Kingdom: Plantae
- Clade: Tracheophytes
- Clade: Angiosperms
- Clade: Eudicots
- Clade: Asterids
- Order: Lamiales
- Family: Oleaceae
- Tribe: Fontanesieae
- Genus: Fontanesia; Labill.
- Species: F. phillyreoides

Binomial name
- Fontanesia phillyreoides Labill.

= Fontanesia =

Genus of flowering plants

Fontanesia is a genus of flowering plants in the family Oleaceae, usually treated as comprising a single species Fontanesia phillyreoides, though some authors split this into two species (see below). It is native to southern Europe (Sicily), southwestern Asia (Lebanon, Syria, Turkey) and eastern Asia (China), with two well-separated populations.

It is a deciduous shrub growing to 8 m tall. The leaves are opposite, lanceolate to narrow ovate, 3–12 cm long and 8–26 mm broad, with an acute apex and a usually entire margin, sometimes finely serrated. The flowers are white, with a deeply four-lobed corolla; they are produced in panicles 2–6 cm long. The fruit is a flat samara, surrounded by a wing.

There are two subspecies, often treated in the past as separate species. Despite the distance separating the two, the differences between them are minimal; the leaves of subsp. phillyreoides are sometimes cited as having finely serrated margins, but this character is not reliable.

- Fontanesia phillyreoides subsp. phillyreoides. Italy, Turkey, Syria, Lebanon. Leaves up to 8 cm long, dull green above.
- Fontanesia phillyreoides subsp. fortunei (Carr.) Yalt. (syn. F. fortunei Carr.; F. phillyreoides var. sinensis Debeaux). China (Anhui, Hebei, Henan, Hubei, Jiangsu, Shaanxi, Shandong, Zhejiang). Leaves up to 12 cm long, glossy green above.

The species epithet was originally published erroneously as "philliraeoides", but this is a correctable error, because it refers to the genus Phillyrea.
