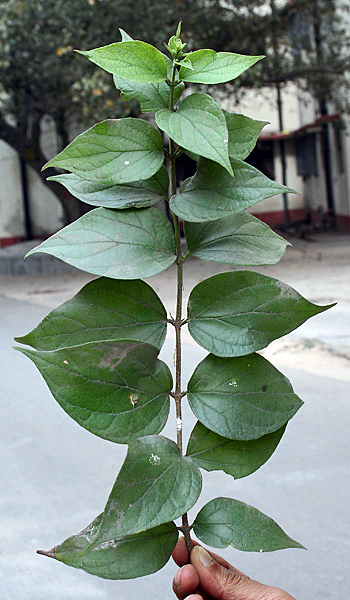
- Nyctanthes arbor-tristis

Scientific classification
- Kingdom: Plantae
- Clade: Tracheophytes
- Clade: Angiosperms
- Clade: Eudicots
- Clade: Asterids
- Order: Lamiales
- Family: Oleaceae
- Tribe: Myxopyreae
- Genus: Nyctanthes; L.

Type species
- Nyctanthes arbor-tristis L.

Synonyms
- Pariaticu Adans.; Scabrita L.; Parilium Gaertn.; Omolocarpus Neck.; Bruschia Bertol.

= Nyctanthes =

Genus of flowering plants

Nyctanthes is a genus of flowering plants in the family Oleaceae, native to southeastern Asia. It is currently accepted as containing two species; other species previously included in this genus have been transferred to other genera, most of them to Jasminum.

They are shrubs or small trees growing to 10 m tall, with flaky bark. The leaves are opposite, simple. The flowers are produced in small clusters of two to seven together. The fruit is a two-parted capsule, with a single seed in each part. The name Nyctanthes means "night flowering".

Species

1. Nyctanthes aculeata Craib – Thailand
2. Nyctanthes arbor-tristis L. - (Night-flowering jasmine or "sad tree") native to Bangladesh, India, Nepal, Bhutan, Assam, Arunachal Pradesh, Java, Sri Lanka and Sumatra.
