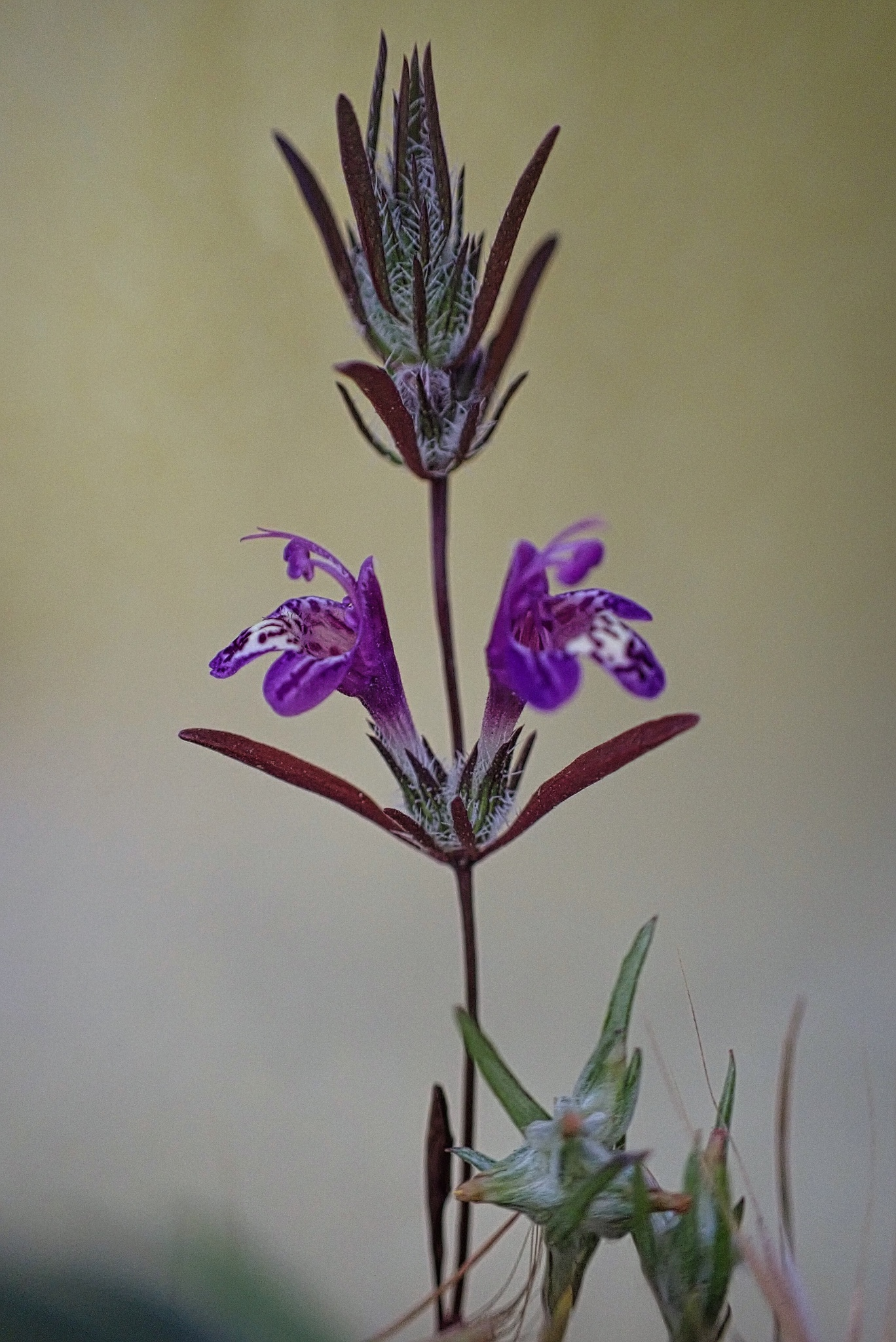

Conservation status
- Critically Imperiled (NatureServe)

- Endangered (ESA)

Scientific classification
- Kingdom: Plantae
- Clade: Tracheophytes
- Clade: Angiosperms
- Clade: Eudicots
- Clade: Asterids
- Order: Lamiales
- Family: Lamiaceae
- Genus: Pogogyne
- Species: P. abramsii

Binomial name
- Pogogyne abramsii J.T.Howell

= Pogogyne abramsii =

Species of flowering plant

Pogogyne abramsii is a rare species of flowering plant in the mint family known by the common name San Diego mesa mint.

== Description ==
Pogogyne abramsii is a small, aromatic, densely hairy annual herb producing erect stems topped with tiny but showy inflorescences. The inflorescence contains purple-tinged green bracts and densely hairy sepals surrounding lipped, bell-shaped flowers each about a centimeter long. The flower is pinkish-purple with a purple-spotted white throat. It has a strong mint scent.

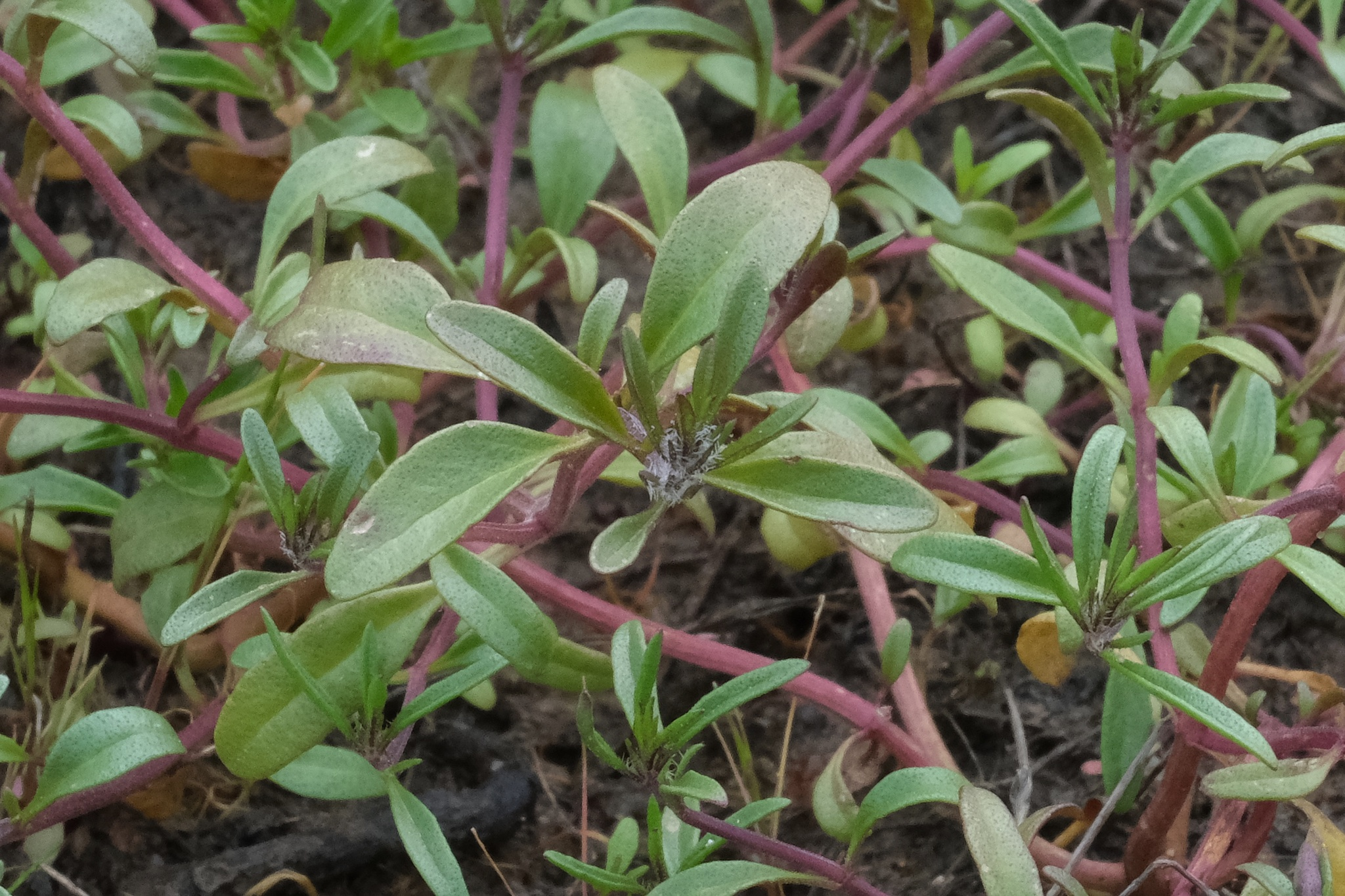
Vegetative examples of Pogogyne abramsii

The plant is pollinated by several species of bee, including honey bees (Apis mellifera), Exomalopsis nitens and E. torticornis, and the bee fly Bombylius facialis.

The epithet abramsii commemorates LeRoy Abrams.

== Distribution ==
It is endemic to San Diego County, California, where it is known only from a few sites at vernal pools in and around San Diego and its suburbs. Much of its range is located on the grounds of Marine Corps Air Station Miramar. The plant has been federally listed as an endangered species since 1978.

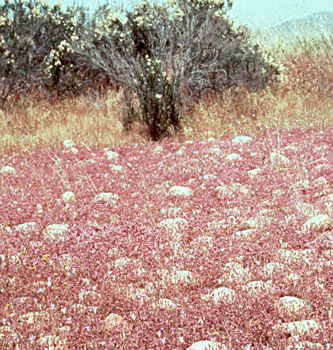
A number of plants in habitat
