= Comoranthus =

Mayotte lilac

Scientific classification
- Kingdom: Plantae
- Clade: Tracheophytes
- Clade: Angiosperms
- Clade: Eudicots
- Clade: Asterids
- Order: Lamiales
- Family: Oleaceae
- Tribe: Oleeae
- Subtribe: Schreberinae
- Genus: Comoranthus; Knobl.

Species
- 3 species; see text.

Genus of flowering plants

Comoranthus is a plant genus native to Madagascar and the Comoro Islands. It contains 3 species:

- Comoranthus madagascariensis H.Perrier - western Madagascar
- Comoranthus minor H.Perrier - southwestern Madagascar
- Comoranthus obconicus Knobl. - Mayotte Island
