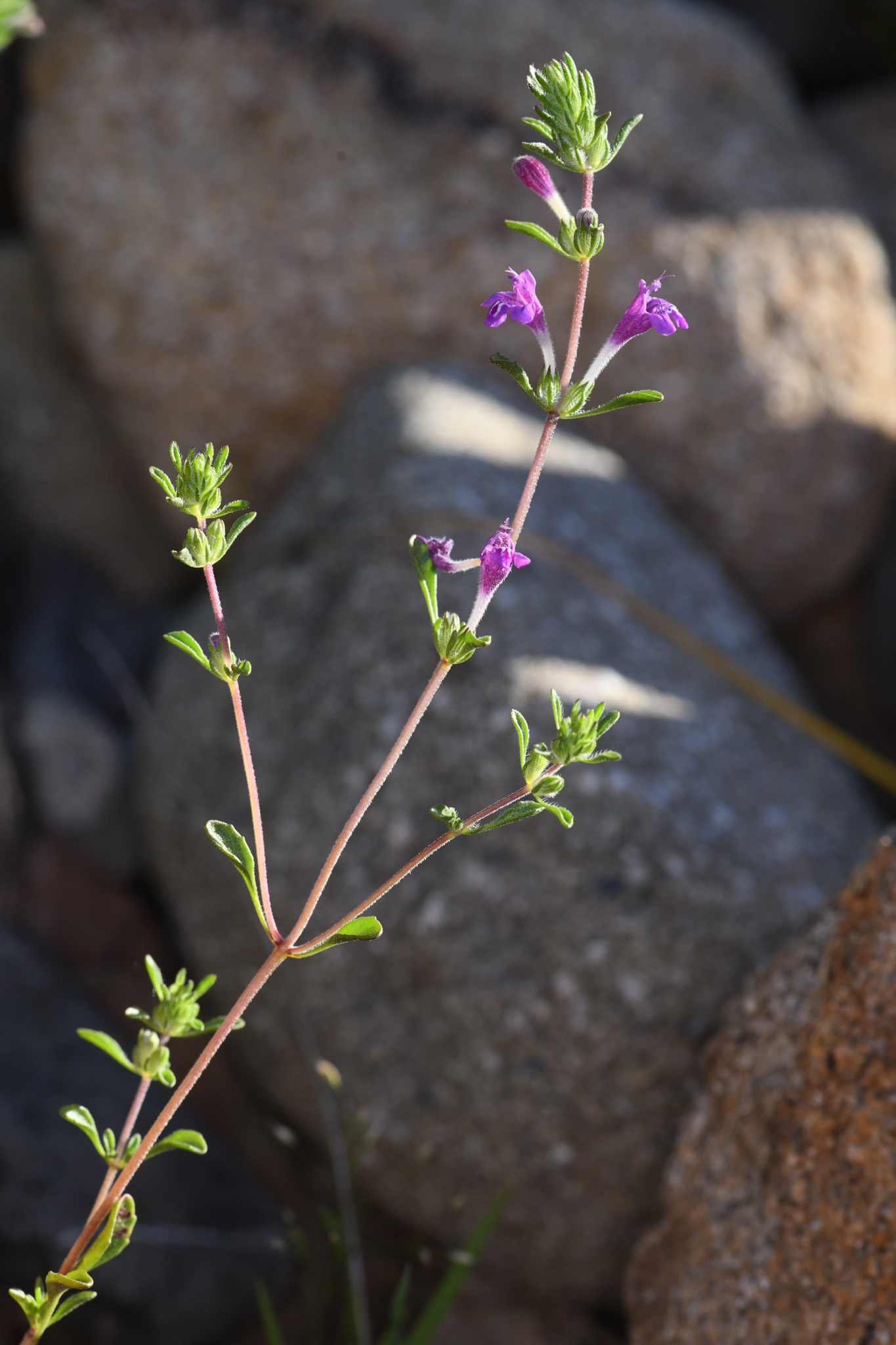

Conservation status
- Critically Imperiled (NatureServe)

Scientific classification
- Kingdom: Plantae
- Clade: Tracheophytes
- Clade: Angiosperms
- Clade: Eudicots
- Clade: Asterids
- Order: Lamiales
- Family: Lamiaceae
- Genus: Pogogyne
- Species: P. clareana

Binomial name
- Pogogyne clareana J.T.Howell

= Pogogyne clareana =

Species of flowering plant

Pogogyne clareana is a rare species of flowering plant in the mint family known by the common name Santa Lucia mint. It is endemic to Monterey, California, where it is known only from about fifty occurrences all located within the bounds of Fort Hunter Liggett, a US Army training facility. The local habitat is made up of chaparral and oak woodland with occasional vernal pools and summer-dry creek beds.

This is a small, aromatic annual herb producing slender, erect stems 15 to 25 centimeters tall. Stems are topped with small but showy inflorescences containing hairy sepals and lipped, funnel-shaped flowers in shades of pinkish-purple with purple-spotted white throats. They have a strong mint scent. The plants flower for about two weeks in June, and each produces a single seed.

The plant has a very limited range and faces threats there that include erosion, vehicles and military activity, and dust from dirt roads.
