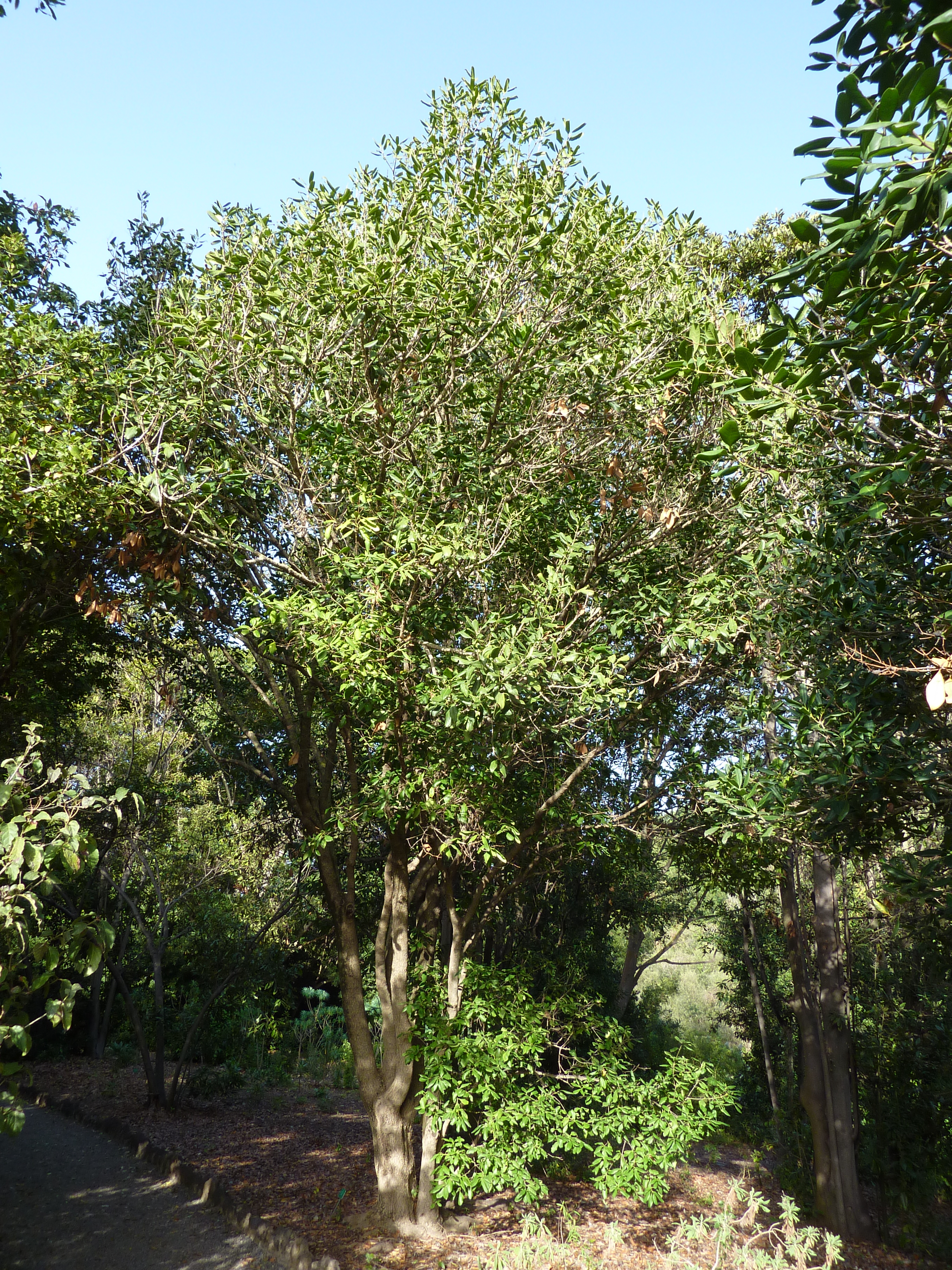

Scientific classification
- Kingdom: Plantae
- Clade: Tracheophytes
- Clade: Angiosperms
- Clade: Eudicots
- Clade: Asterids
- Order: Lamiales
- Family: Oleaceae
- Tribe: Oleeae
- Subtribe: Oleinae
- Genus: Picconia; DC.

Species
- See text

= Picconia =

Genus of flowering plants

Picconia is a genus of two species of flowering plants in the family Oleaceae, found in the laurel forests habitat of Macaronesia.

== Description ==
They are evergreen shrubs to trees with large, opposite, entire, shiny, ovoid leaves and numerous flowers. The fruit is a drupe. The flowers are small, white and fragrant, followed by one-seeded, olive-like green fruits, ripening to bluish-black. Picconia are native of open spots in the laurel forest of the Azores, Madeira and Canary Islands where they are found only in the humid to hyper-humid evergreen forests of the cloud belt. Tree species with laurel-like leaves are predominant, forming a dense canopy up to 40 m high that blocks out most light, resulting in scant vegetation in the understory. Most of these tree species in Africa are ancient paleoendemic species of the genera Laurus, Ocotea, Persea, and Picconia, which in ancient times were widely distributed on the African and European continents.

== Species ==
- Picconia azorica - endemic to the archipelago of the Azores
- Picconia excelsa - tree up to 15m; Madeira, Canaries
