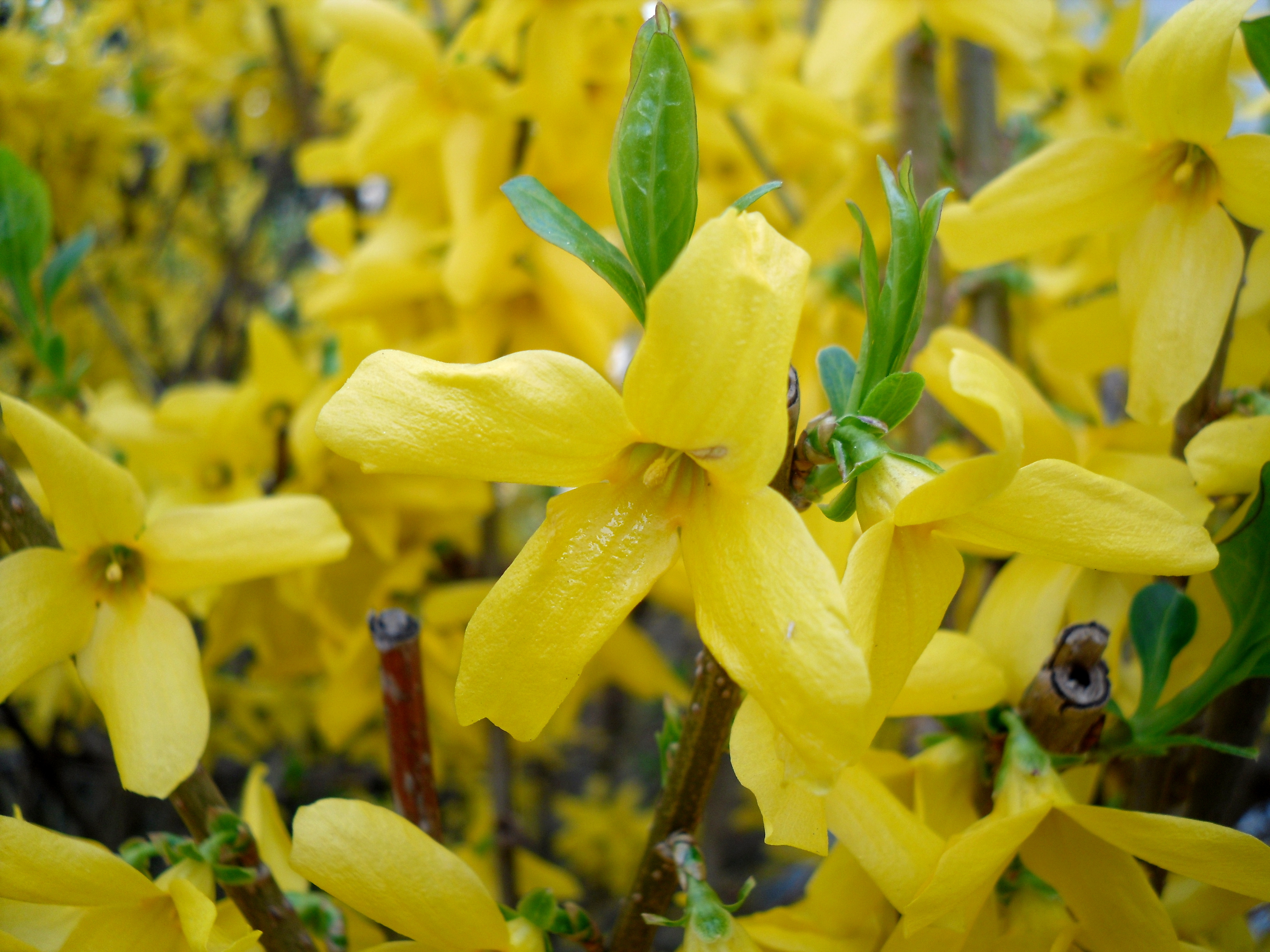
- Flowers of Forsythia

Scientific classification
- Kingdom: Plantae
- Clade: Tracheophytes
- Clade: Angiosperms
- Clade: Eudicots
- Clade: Asterids
- Order: Lamiales
- Family: Oleaceae
- Tribe: Forsythieae

Genera
- Abeliophyllum; Forsythia

= Forsythieae =

Tribe of flowering plants

Forsythieae is a tribe of flowering plants in the family Oleaceae.

== Genera ==
- Abeliophyllum Nakai
- Forsythia Vahl
