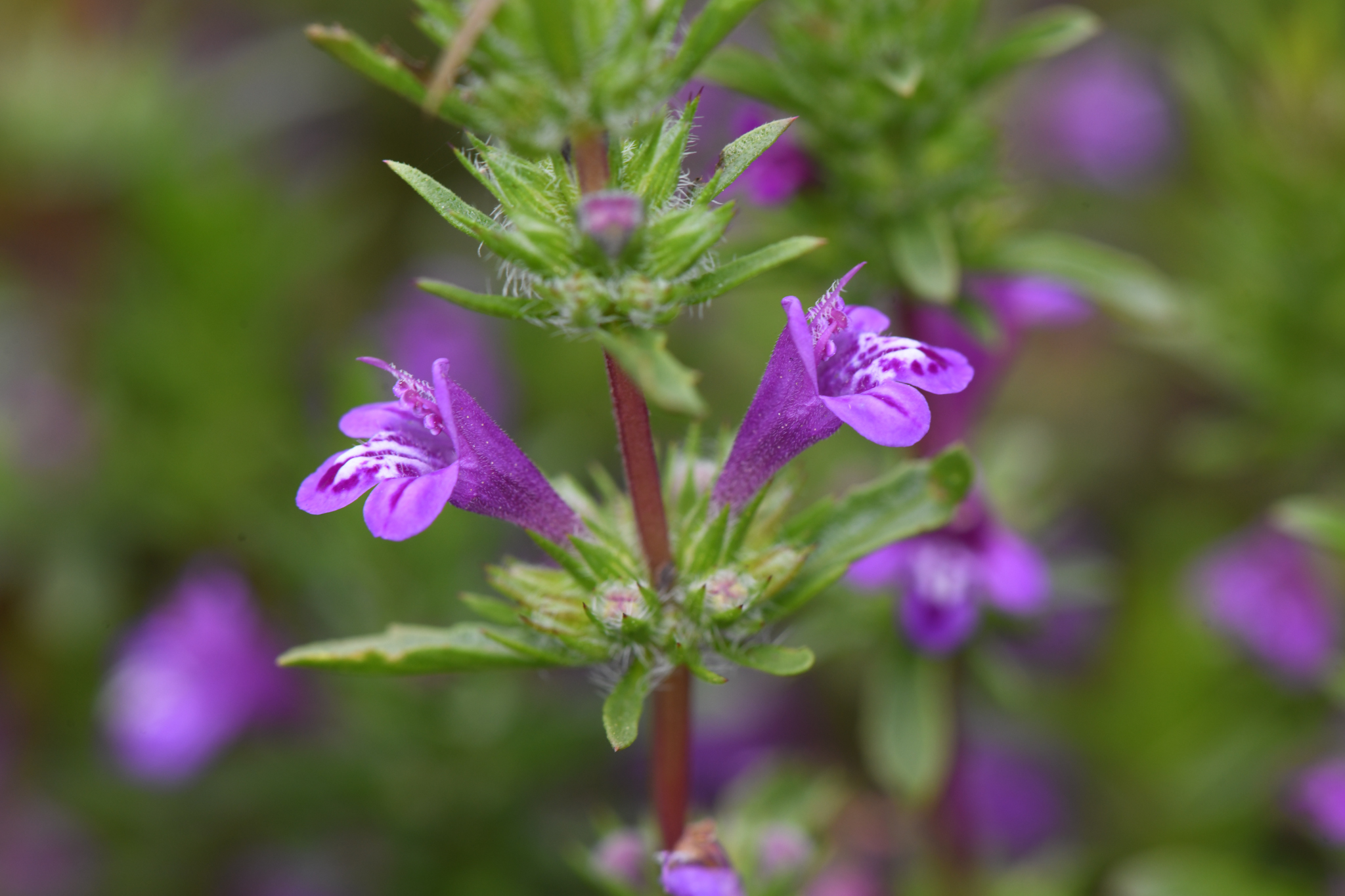

Conservation status
- Endangered (ESA)

Scientific classification
- Kingdom: Plantae
- Clade: Tracheophytes
- Clade: Angiosperms
- Clade: Eudicots
- Clade: Asterids
- Order: Lamiales
- Family: Lamiaceae
- Genus: Pogogyne
- Species: P. nudiuscula

Binomial name
- Pogogyne nudiuscula A.Gray

= Pogogyne nudiuscula =

Otay mesa mint

Species of flowering plant

Pogogyne nudiuscula is a rare species of flowering plant in the mint family known by the common name Otay mesa mint. It is native to southern San Diego County, California, where it is known only from Otay Mesa near the border with Baja California. It was identified on land south of the Mexican border, but these occurrences have probably been extirpated. It is now known from seven vernal pool complexes just north of the border, and it is a federally listed endangered species of the United States.

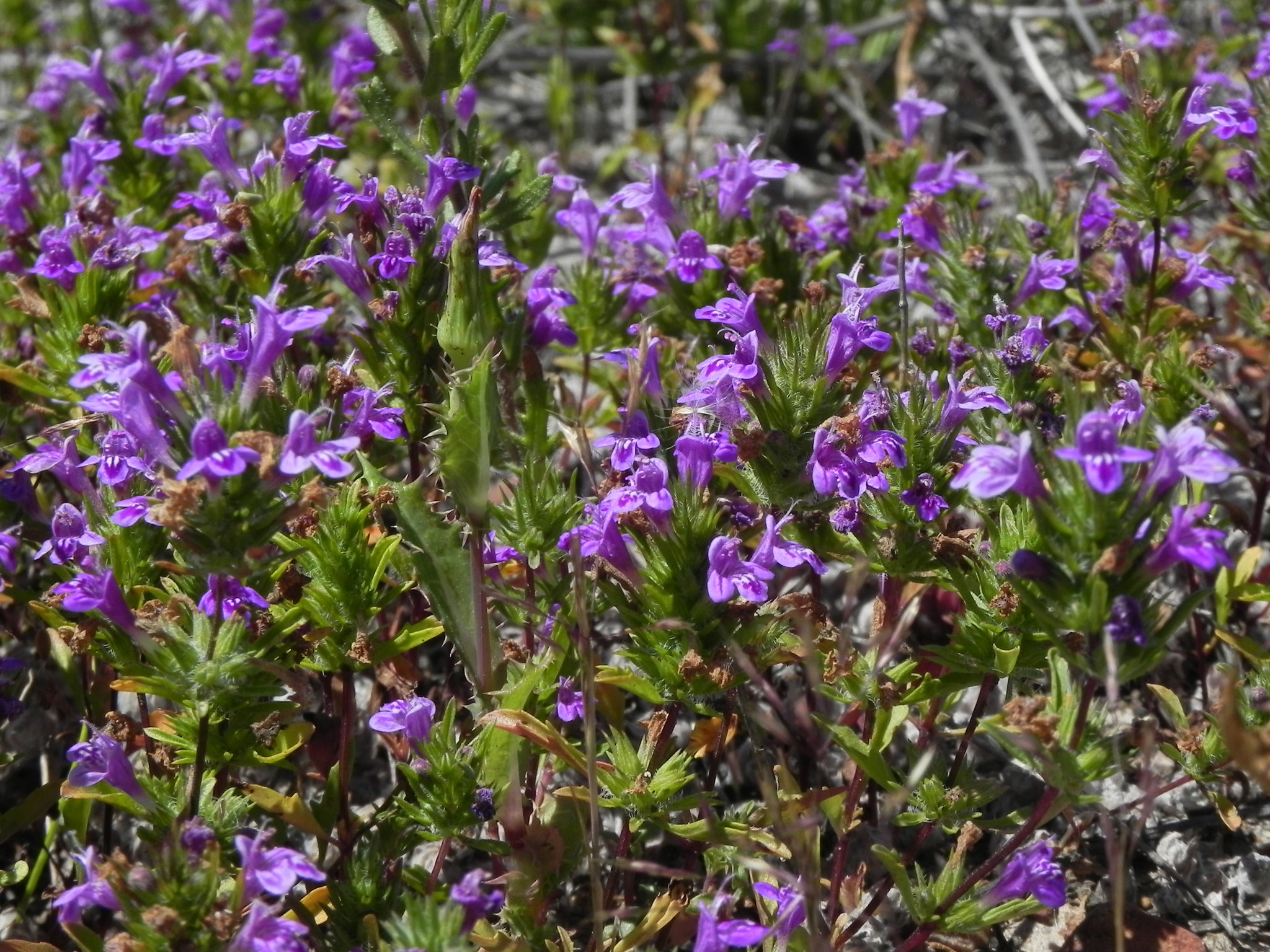
A number of plants in habitat

This annual herb produces an erect stem 9–30 cm (3.5–11.8 in) in height. Its herbage is strongly aromatic and coated very thinly with straight, bristle-like hairs, or no hair. The inflorescence, 10–20 mm (0.39–0.79 in) wide, consists of interrupted clusters of opposite cymes. The bracts are green with acute tips. The flowers have a tube 3–5 mm (0.12–0.20 in) long with a bell-shaped corolla 11–14 mm (0.43–0.55 in) long. The corolla is purple. It flowers from March to June.

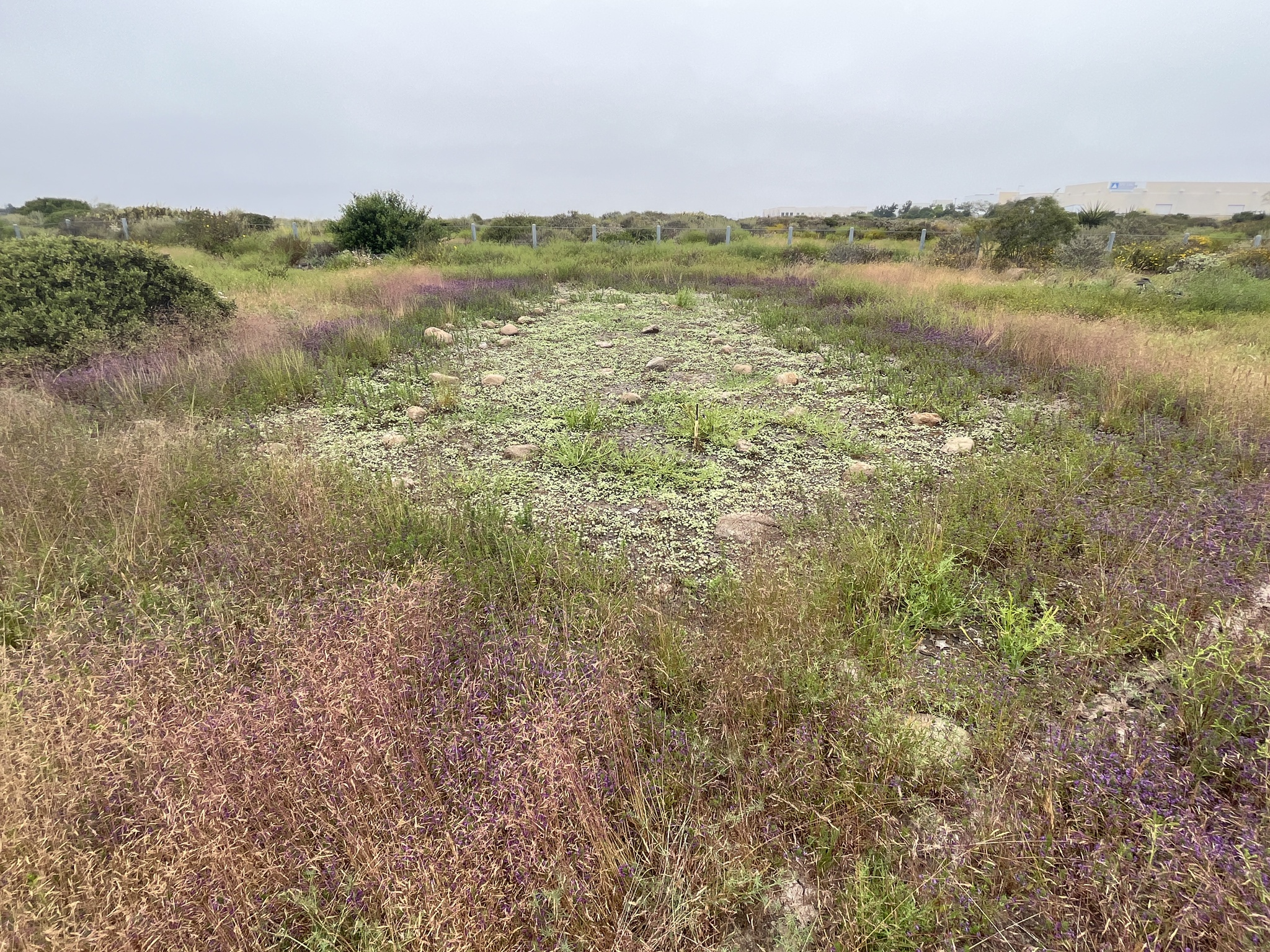
The vernal pool habitat of Pogogyne nudiuscula

Pogogyne nudiuscula is found in coastal mesa vernal pools at elevations of 100–250 m (330–820 ft) on Otay Mesa, in southern San Diego County, California. It was formerly found in the vernal pools of extreme northwestern Baja California, Mexico, near the Tijuana Airport, but these populations are likely extirpated.

This plant faces a number of threats related to the loss and destruction of habitat containing its rare vernal pool ecosystem. These threats include urban development, trash dumping and pollution, vehicles, fire, grazing, and alterations in the local hydrology.
