= Dimetra craibiana =

Scientific classification
- Kingdom: Plantae
- Clade: Tracheophytes
- Clade: Angiosperms
- Clade: Eudicots
- Clade: Asterids
- Order: Lamiales
- Family: Oleaceae
- Tribe: Myxopyreae
- Genus: Dimetra; Kerr
- Species: D. craibiana

Binomial name
- Dimetra craibiana Kerr

Species of flowering plant

Dimetra is a plant genus in the family Oleaceae. It contains the single species Dimetra craibiana, native to Thailand and Laos. The genus and species were described in 1938 by the Irish botanist Arthur Francis George Kerr.
