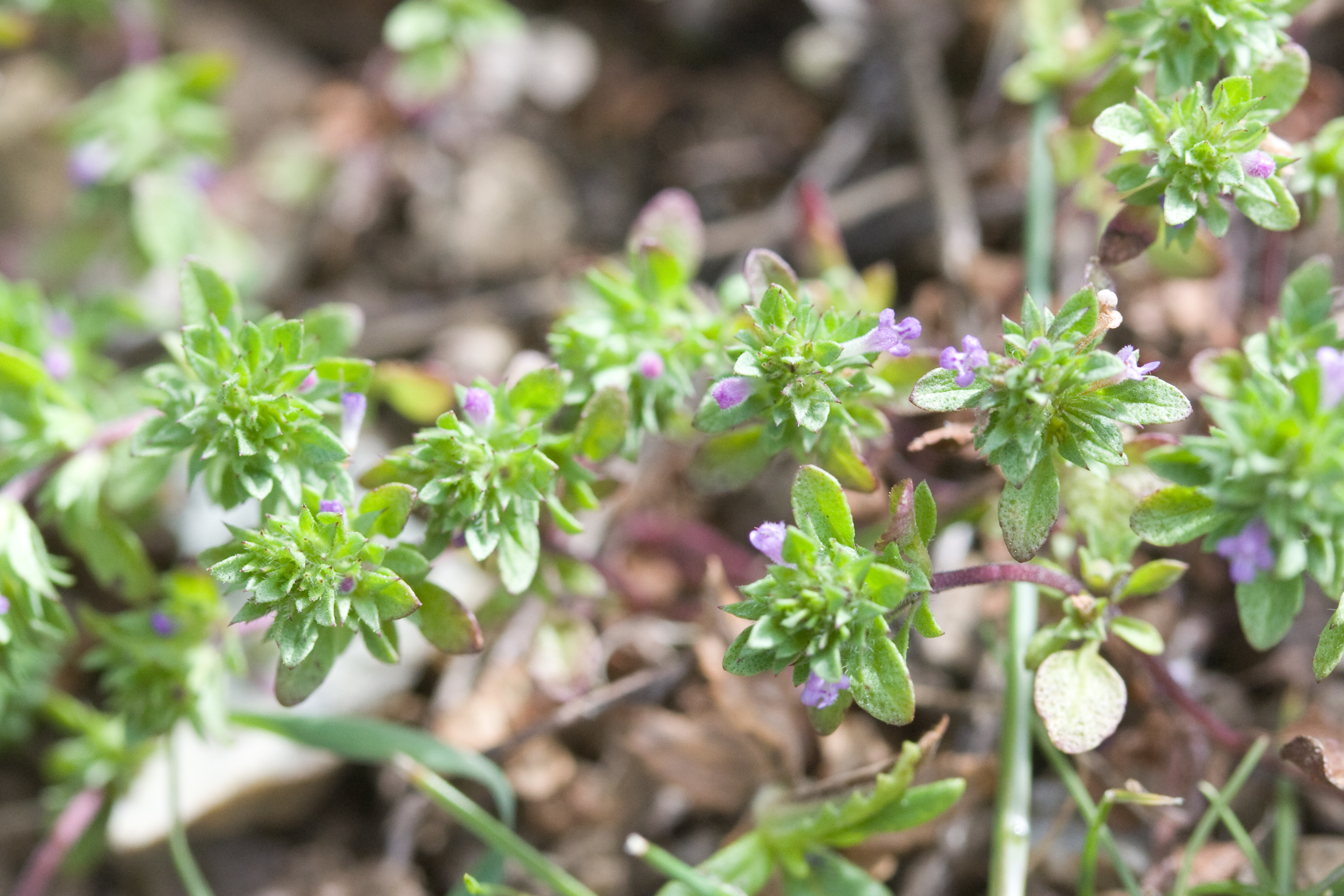

Scientific classification
- Kingdom: Plantae
- Clade: Tracheophytes
- Clade: Angiosperms
- Clade: Eudicots
- Clade: Asterids
- Order: Lamiales
- Family: Lamiaceae
- Genus: Pogogyne
- Species: P. serpylloides

Binomial name
- Pogogyne serpylloides (Torr.) A.Gray

= Pogogyne serpylloides =

Species of flowering plant

Pogogyne serpylloides is a species of flowering plant in the mint family known by the common names thymeleaf mesamint and thymeleaf beardstyle. It is endemic to central California, where it grows in grassy habitat in coastal and inland mountain ranges and foothills. It is a petite aromatic annual herb growing decumbent or upright, often reaching no more than a centimeter in height even when erect in form, sometimes larger. The slender stem is sometimes branched. The inflorescence is a series of rounded, headlike clusters, with occasional single flowers emerging at leaf axils. The tiny tubular flower is 2 to 5 millimeters long and has a lobed, lipped mouth. It is lavender in color, sometimes with faint white markings in the mouth.

A specimen belonging to this species was once collected in Baja California by Charles Russell Orcutt in 1886. It was also reported from the area around San Quintín. The species has not been found in Mexico since.
