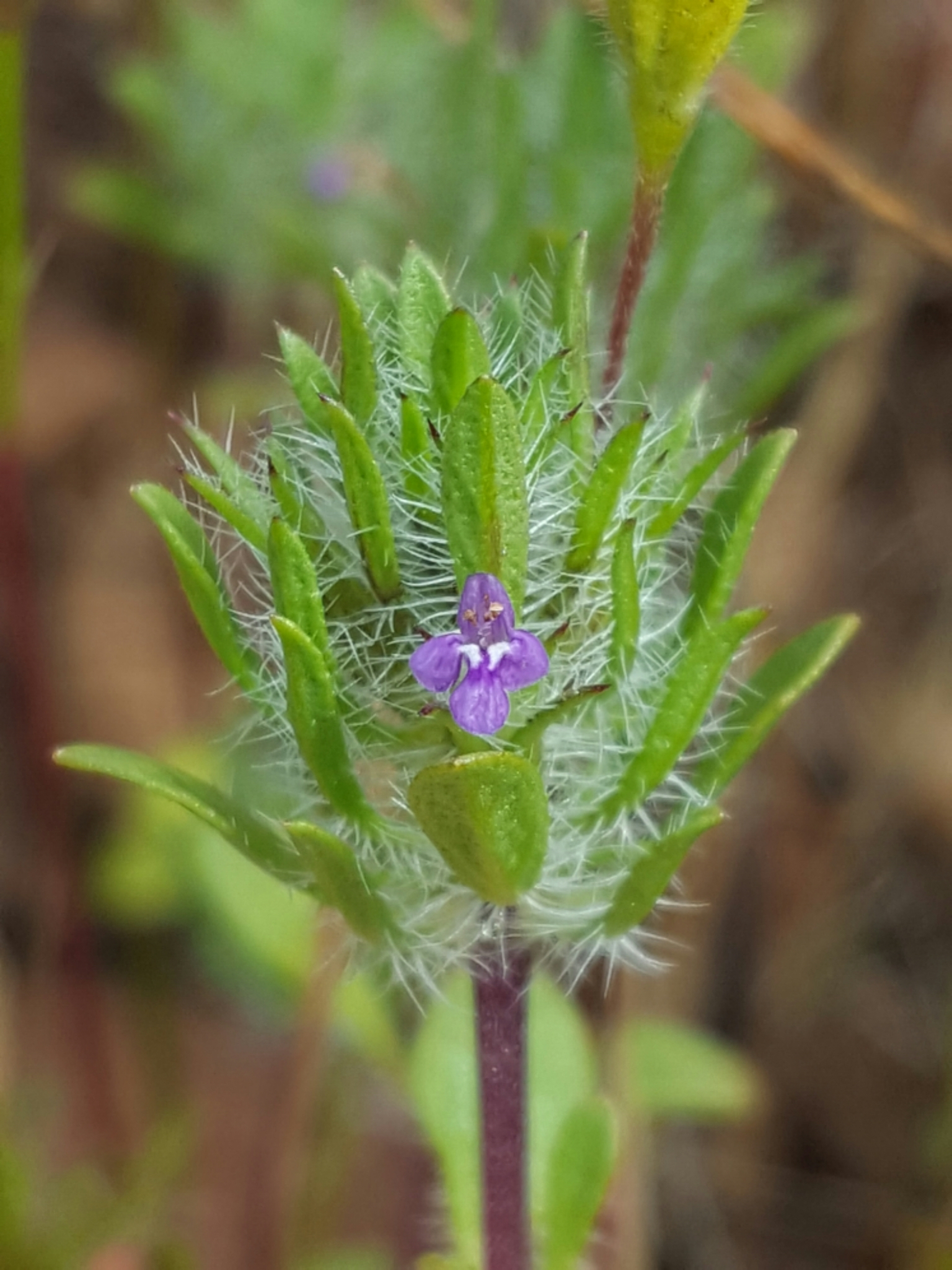

Scientific classification
- Kingdom: Plantae
- Clade: Tracheophytes
- Clade: Angiosperms
- Clade: Eudicots
- Clade: Asterids
- Order: Lamiales
- Family: Lamiaceae
- Genus: Pogogyne
- Species: P. zizyphoroides

Binomial name
- Pogogyne zizyphoroides Benth.

Synonyms
- Pogogyne ziziphoroides (orth. var.)

= Pogogyne zizyphoroides =

Species of flowering plant

Pogogyne zizyphoroides is a species of flowering plant in the mint family known by the common names Sacramento mesamint and Sacramento beardstyle.

It is native to central and northern California and southwestern Oregon. It grows in vernal pools and similar habitats, including in the Central Valley and California Coast Ranges.

== Description ==
Pogogyne zizyphoroides is an aromatic annual herb growing erect, its sturdy stem topped with a rounded, headlike inflorescence or interrupted series of two or more clusters.

Some flowers also emerge at the leaf axils. The tubular, lipped flower is under a centimeter long and purple in color, sometimes with white in the throat. Each flower is surrounded by long, hairy green sepals.
