= Priogymnanthus =

Scientific classification
- Kingdom: Plantae
- Clade: Tracheophytes
- Clade: Angiosperms
- Clade: Eudicots
- Clade: Asterids
- Order: Lamiales
- Family: Oleaceae
- Tribe: Oleeae
- Subtribe: Oleinae
- Genus: Priogymnanthus; P.S.Green

Species
- See text

Genus of flowering plants

Priogymnanthus is a genus of three species of flowering plants in the family Oleaceae native to tropical South America, in Bolivia, Brazil, Colombia, Ecuador, Argentina and Paraguay.

They are deciduous or semi-deciduous trees, closely related to Mesoamerican Chionanthus and Forestiera.

Species

- Priogymnanthus apertus (B.Ståhl) P.S.Green - Ecuador
- Priogymnanthus colombianus Fern.Alonso. & P.A. Morales-M. - Colombia
- Priogymnanthus hasslerianus (Chodat) P.S.Green - Bolivia, Brazil, Paraguay, Argentina
