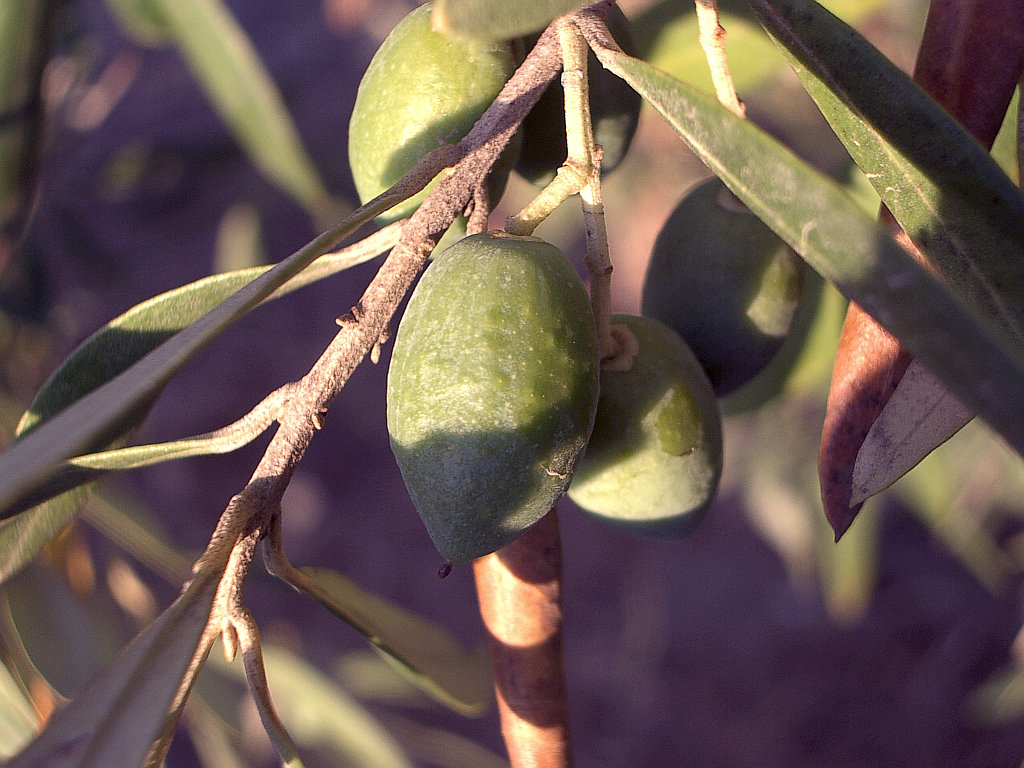
- Olive (Olea europaea)

Scientific classification
- Kingdom: Plantae
- Clade: Tracheophytes
- Clade: Angiosperms
- Clade: Eudicots
- Clade: Asterids
- Order: Lamiales
- Family: Oleaceae; Hoffmanns. & Link

Tribes
- Fontanesieae; Forsythieae; Jasmineae; Myxopyreae; Oleeae

Synonyms
- Bolivariaceae Griseb.; Forstiereae (Forstieraceae) Endl.; Fraxineae (Fraxinaceae) S.F. Gray; Iasmineae (Iasminaceae) Link; Jasmineae (Jasminaceae) Juss.; Lilacaceae Ventenat; Nyctantheae (Nyctanthaceae) J.G. Agardh; Syringaceae Horan.

= Oleaceae =

Family of flowering plants

Oleaceae (/ˌoʊliˈeɪsi.iː, -ˌaɪ/), also known as the olive family or sometimes the lilac family, is a taxonomic family of flowering shrubs, trees, and a few lianas in the order Lamiales. It presently comprises 28 genera, one of which is recently extinct. The extant genera include Cartrema, which was resurrected in 2012. The number of species in the Oleaceae is variously estimated in a wide range around 700. The flowers are often numerous and highly odoriferous. The family has a subcosmopolitan distribution, ranging from the subarctic to the southernmost parts of Africa, Australia, and South America. Notable members include olive, ash, jasmine, and several popular ornamental plants including privet, forsythia, fringetrees, and lilac.

== Genera ==
The following 29 extant genera are recognized in the family Oleaceae. Linociera is not included, even though some authors continue to recognize it. Linociera is not easy to distinguish from Chionanthus, mostly because the latter is polyphyletic and not clearly defined.

- Tribe Myxopyreae
  - Myxopyrum Blume
  - Dimetra Kerr
  - Nyctanthes L.
- Tribe Forsythieae
  - Abeliophyllum Nakai – white forsythia
  - Forsythia Vahl – forsythia
- Tribe Fontanesieae
  - Fontanesia Labill.
- Tribe Jasmineae
  - Chrysojasminum Banfi
  - Menodora Humb. & Bonpl.
  - Jasminum L. – jasmine
- Tribe Oleeae
  - Subtribe Ligustrinae
    - Syringa L. – lilac
    - Ligustrum L. – privet
  - Subtribe Schreberinae
    - Comoranthus Knobl.
    - Schrebera Roxb.
  - Subtribe Fraxininae
    - Fraxinus L. – ash
  - Subtribe Oleinae
    - Cartrema Raf.
    - Chengiodendron C.B.Shang, X.R.Wang, Yi F.Duan & Yong F.Li
    - Chionanthus L. – fringe tree
    - Forestiera Poir. – swamp privet
    - Haenianthus Griseb.
    - Hesperelaea † A.Gray
    - Nestegis Raf.
    - Noronhia Stadman ex Thouars
    - Notelaea Vent.
    - Olea L. – olive
    - Osmanthus Lour. – osmanthus
    - Phillyrea L. – mock-privet
    - Picconia D.C.
    - Priogymnanthus P.S.Green
    - Tetrapilus Lour.

== Overview ==
The type genus for Oleaceae is Olea, the olives. Recent classifications recognize no subfamilies, but the family is divided into five tribes. The distinctiveness of each tribe has been strongly supported in molecular phylogenetic studies, but the relationships among the tribes were not clarified until 2014. The phylogenetic tree for Oleaceae is a 5-grade that can be represented as {Myxopyreae [Forsythieae (Fontanesieae <Jasmineae + Oleeae>)]}.

The major centers of diversity for Oleaceae are in Southeast Asia and Australia. There are also a significant number of species in Africa, China, and North America. In the tropics the family is represented in a variety of habitats, from low-lying dry forest to montane cloud forest. In Oleaceae, the seed dispersal is almost entirely by wind or animals. In the case that the fruit is a berry, the species is mostly dispersed by birds. The wind-dispersed fruits are samaras.

Some of the older works have recognized as many as 29 genera in Oleaceae. Today, most authors recognize at least 25, but this number will change because some of these genera have recently been shown to be polyphyletic.

Estimates of the number of species in Oleaceae have ranged from 600 to 900. Most of the species number discrepancy is due to the genus Jasminum in which as few as 200 or as many as 450 species have been accepted.

In spite of the sparsity of the fossil record, and the inaccuracy of molecular-clock dating, it is clear that Oleaceae is an ancient family that became widely distributed early in its history. Some of the genera are believed to be relictual populations that remained unchanged over long periods because of isolation imposed by geographical barriers like the low-elevation areas that separate mountain peaks.

== Description ==
Members of the family Oleaceae are woody plants, mostly trees and shrubs; a few are lianas. Some of the shrubs are scandent, climbing by scrambling into other vegetation.

Leaves without stipules; simple or pinnately or ternately compound. The family is characterized by opposite leaves. Alternate or whorled arrangements are rarely observed, with some Jasminum species presenting a spiral configuration. The laminas are pinnately veined and can be serrate, dentate or entire at the margin. Domatia are observed in certain taxa. The leaves may be either deciduous or evergreen, with evergreen species predominating in warm temperate and tropical regions, and deciduous species predominating in colder regions.

The flowers are most often bisexual and actinomorphic, occurring in racemes or panicles, and often fragrant. The calyx and corolla, when present, are gamosepalous and gamopetalous, respectively, their lobes connate, at least at the base. The androecium has 2 stamens. These are inserted on the corolla tube and alternate with the corolla lobes. The stigmas are two-lobed. The gynoecium consists of a compound pistil with two carpels. The ovary is superior with two locules. The placentation is axile. Ovules usually 2 per locule; sometimes 4, rarely many. Nectary disk, when present, encircling the base of the ovary. The plants are most often hermaphrodite but sometimes polygamomonoecious.

The fruit can be a berry, drupe, capsule or samaras.

The obvious feature that distinguishes Oleaceae and its sister family, Carlemanniaceae, from all others, is the fact that while the flowers are actinomorphic, the number of stamens is reduced to two.

Many members of the family are economically significant. The olive (Olea europaea) is important for its fruit and for the olive oil extracted from it. The ashes (Fraxinus) are valued for their tough wood. Forsythias, lilacs, jasmines, osmanthuses, privets, and fringe trees are valued as ornamental plants in gardens and landscaping. At least two species of jasmine are the source of an essential oil. Their flowers are often added to tea.

== History ==
Carl Linnaeus named eight of the genera of Oleaceae in 1753 in his Species Plantarum. He did not designate what we now know as plant families, but placed his genera in artificial groups for purposes of identification. After the work of Linnaeus, names for groups that included the genera of Oleaceae were used, but none of them was a valid publication of the family name Oleaceae. For example, Antoine Laurent de Jussieu, in his Genera Plantarum in 1789, placed them in an order which he called "Jasmineae". In 1809, in a flora of Portugal, Johann Centurius Hoffmannsegg and Johann H.F. Link described at the taxonomic rank of family a group which they called "Oleinae". Their description is now regarded as the establishment of what we now know as Oleaceae.

The last revision of Oleaceae was published in 2004 in a series entitled The Families and Genera of Vascular Plants. Since that time, molecular phylogenetic work has shown that the next revision of Oleaceae must include substantial changes to the circumscription of genera.

== Classification ==
Oleaceae is most closely related to the small Indo-Malesian family Carlemanniaceae. These two families form the second most basal clade in the order Lamiales, after Plocospermataceae. The families Plocospermataceae, Carlemanniaceae, Oleaceae, and Tetrachondraceae form a polyphyletic group known as the "basal Lamiales", which is in contrast to the monophyletic "core Lamiales".

== Taxonomy ==
Oleaceae is one of only a few major plant families for which no well-sampled molecular phylogenetic study has ever been conducted. The only DNA sequence study of the entire family sampled 76 species for two noncoding chloroplast loci, rps16 and trnL–F. Little was determined in this study, largely because the mutation rate in the chloroplast genome of Oleaceae is very low compared to that of most other angiosperm families.

Also, the family is notorious for incongruence between phylogenies based on plastid and nuclear DNA. The most likely cause of this incongruence is reticulate evolution resulting from rampant hybridization.

The delimitation of genera in Oleaceae has always been especially problematic. Some recent studies of small groups of related genera have shown that some of the genera are not monophyletic. For example, Olea section Tetrapilus is separate from the rest of Olea. It is a distinct group of 23 species and had been named as a genus, Tetrapilus, by João de Loureiro in 1790.

The genus Ligustrum has long been suspected of having originated from within Syringa, and this was confirmed in a cladistic comparison of selected chloroplast genes.

Osmanthus consists of at least three lineages whose closest relatives are not other lineages of Osmanthus.

Chionanthus is highly polyphyletic, with its species scattered across the phylogenetic tree of the subtribe Oleinae. Its African species are closer to Noronhia than to its type species, the North American Chionanthus virginicus. Its Madagascan species are phylogenetically within Noronhia and will be formally transferred to it in a forthcoming paper.

The monophyly of Nestegis is in considerable doubt, but few of its closest relatives have been sampled in phylogenetic studies.
