= Edward Palmer (botanist) =

British botanist and archaeologist (1829–1911)

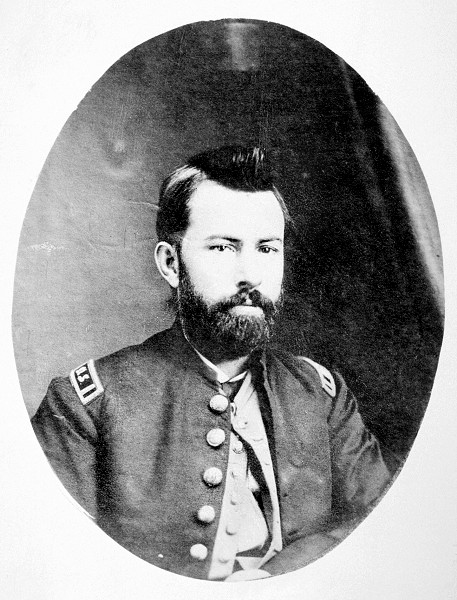
- Portrait while in Kansas City, Missouri, 1864
- Born: 12 January 1829; Hockwold cum Wilton, Norfolk, England
- Died: 10 April 1911 (aged 82); Washington, D.C., United States
- Scientific career
- Fields: Botany; Archaeology
- Workplaces: United States Department of Agriculture; Smithsonian Institution
- Author abbrev. (botany): Palmer

Edward Palmer (12 January 1829 – 10 April 1911) was a self-taught British botanist and an Early-American archaeologist.

== Biography ==
Edward Palmer was born on 12 January 1829 in Hockwold cum Wilton, Norfolk and baptised on 22 February 1829 at Brandon, Suffolk, England, the son of Robert and Mary Palmer. He emigrated to the United States in 1850, where he initially settled in Cleveland, Ohio. He travelled to South America and became a medical doctor, serving with the Union Army during the American Civil War.

Palmer collected biological specimens, primarily plants, for the Smithsonian Institution and the United States Department of Agriculture, among other institutions. According to his biographer:

"The collections made by Edward Palmer between 1853 and 1910 were prepared with more care than those of most of his contemporaries. He was primarily a botanical collector, and his botanical specimens were exceptionally well documented for his time.... [However,] he was unwilling to attend to the documentation and distribution of his own collections, and preferred to entrust them for naming, sorting and selling, to his friends and patrons—prominent scientists all."

He collected specimens in the southwestern United States, Florida, Mexico (including Baja California), and South America. About 200 species and two genera (Palmerella and Malperia) of plants are named in his honor. The standard author abbreviation Palmer is applied to botanical taxa he described.

Palmer's botanical collections (numbering over 100,000) are mostly pressed and dried; they reside at research institutions around the world, including the Smithsonian Institution, Harvard University, the Missouri Botanical Garden, the U.S. National Arboretum, the New York Botanical Garden, Royal Botanic Garden, Kew, and many others. The Palmer botanical collection in the U.S. National Herbarium at the Smithsonian Institution remains the largest, containing over 16,000 specimens that Palmer collected over sixty years. He distributed two exsiccata-like specimen series, namely Algae Bahamenses and Algae Floridanae.

Palmer wrote an 1871 report, Food Products of the North American Indians, which was one of the pioneering works in ethnobotany. He collected specimens of 24 of the 61 plant species described, with their uses, in the report.

Though primarily a botanist, Edward Palmer also contributed to early American archaeology and ethnology. Between 1882 and 1884, Palmer worked as a field assistant for the Bureau of American Ethnology Mound Exploration Division. The purpose of this expedition was to conduct an extensive survey of Indian mounds in the eastern United States. While most of Palmer's archaeological research was performed in Arkansas, he also excavated mounds in Alabama, Louisiana, Mississippi, Tennessee, and Georgia.

While in Georgia, Palmer investigated the Kolomoki Mound site in Early County. Though he excavated many of the mounds at Kolomoki, he is said to have discovered nothing worth cataloguing. However, he examined many "house sites" and found a number of ash deposits and fragments of pottery. In 1894, the Mound Exploration Division final report, written by its director Cyrus Thomas, was published and dispelled racist theories that the mounds of the southeastern United States had been built by a "lost race of Mound-Builders." The report cited ample evidence that the mounds were built by the ancestors of historical native tribes.

Palmer also did significant amounts of archaeological collecting and excavation in the American West, primarily in Utah, Nevada, and Texas, as well as in Mexico, including Baja California, Coahuila, Tamaulipas, San Luis Potosí, and central Mexico. Palmer's Baja California collections recovered from a site near Bahía de los Ángeles was subsequently described and analysed by William C. Massey and Carolyn M. Osborne.

After the Mound Exploration project was completed, Palmer returned to botany and natural history and worked as a Smithsonian field representative, a scientist at the Smithsonian's Bureau of American Ethnology, and a collector and expert at the United States Department of Agriculture in Washington, D.C., until his death on 10 April 1911.

== Family ==
Palmer married Dinah Riches (the daughter of Edmund Riches, a shepherd) at East Barsham, Norfolk, on 29 March 1856. Two months later the newly married Edward and Dinah arrived in New York aboard the ship Amazon. The marriage must have proved unsatisfactory since by April 1861 Dinah had returned to living with her parents at East Barsham.
