= Guadalupe Island Biosphere Reserve =

Natural reserve in Mexico

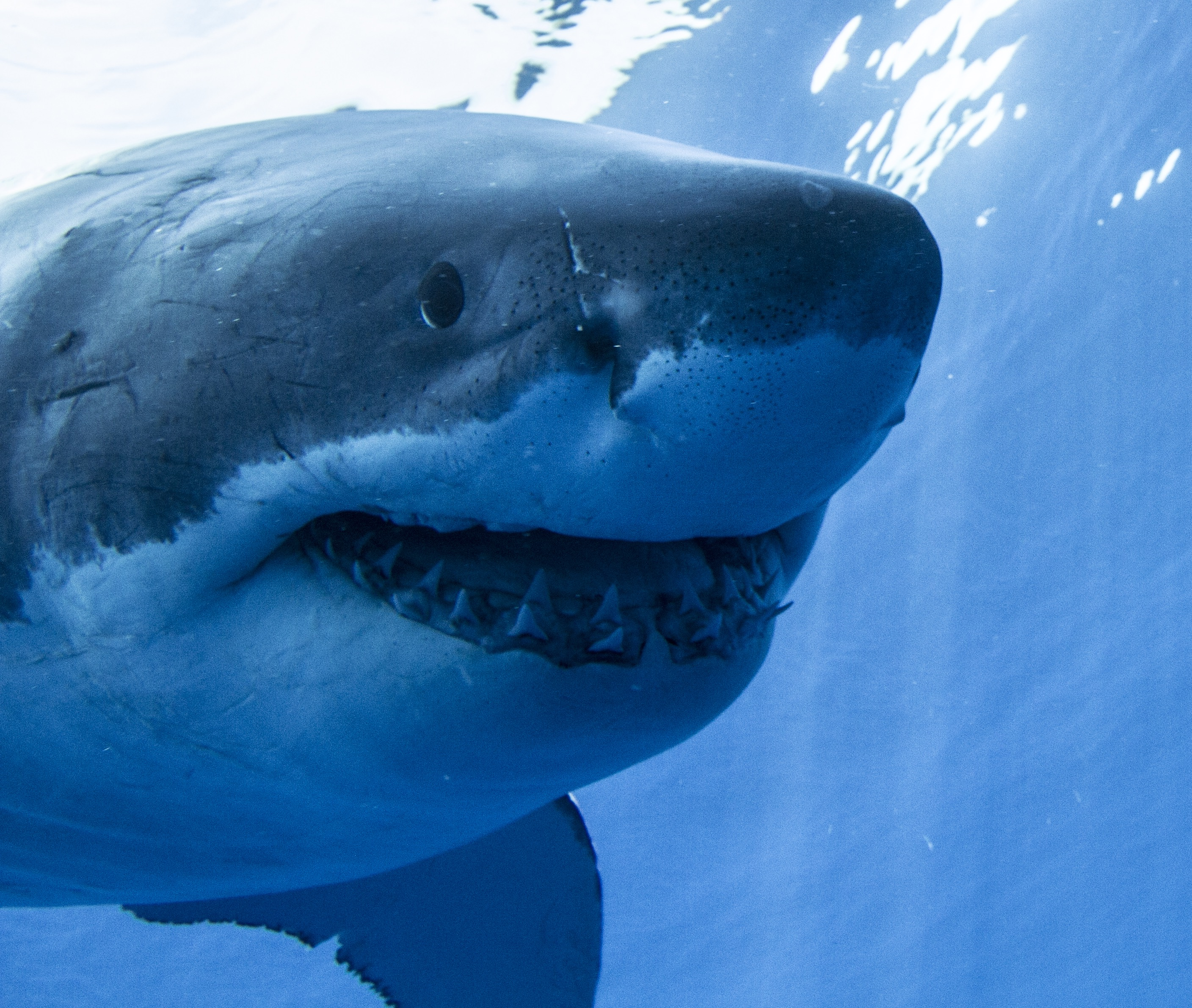
- A Great White Shark at Guadalupe Reserve.

- Location within Mexico
- Location: Baja California, Mexico
- Coordinates: 29.05°N 118.26°W
- Area: 4,770 square kilometres (1,840 sq mi)
- Established: 2005

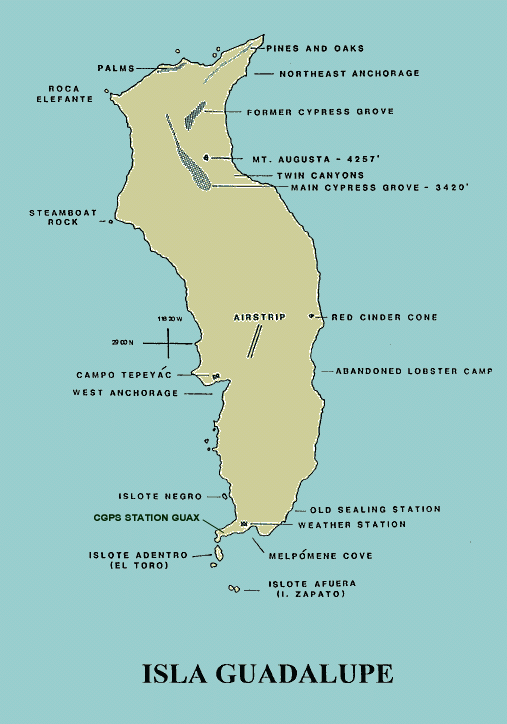
Guadalupe Island

The Guadalupe Island Biosphere Reserve, (Reserva de la Biosfera Isla Guadalupe in Spanish), is in the Pacific Ocean and part of Baja California state of Mexico. The Reserve consists of Guadalupe Island and several small islands nearby plus a large expanse of surrounding ocean. The Reserve was created by the government of Mexico on 25 April 2005 and is located 250 kilometres (160 miles) from the mainland. The Reserve is 4,770 square kilometres (1,840 sq mi) in size of which 263 square kilometres (102 sq mi) is land and the remainder is water.

The Guadalupe Island Biosphere Reserve is in the Southern Californian Pacific Marine Ecoregion and recognized as an important site for preserving the biodiversity of marine and bird life and the often-unique island vegetation. In the 19th century, commercial hunters decimated the population of marine mammals. The vegetation of Guadalupe Island was severely damaged by an excessive population of introduced goats and predation by feral cats has caused the extinction of several endemic bird species.

The Reserve attracts tourists to see marine mammals and other marine life, especially the great white shark, and for sport fishing. Since the designation of the island as a biosphere reserve, goats have been eliminated and programs to restore natural vegetation and wildlife have expanded.

== Geography ==
Guadalupe Island is 36 kilometres (22 miles) from north to south and 12 kilometres (7.5 miles) at its widest. The island is of volcanic origin and rugged and mountainous rising to a maximum elevation of 1,298 metres (4,259 ft) in the north. The northwest coast is characterized by precipitous sea cliffs which rise to a maximum elevation of 900 metres (3,000 ft). The entire island is arid or semi-arid, receiving about 120 millimetres (4.7 in) of precipitation annually at its southern end and somewhat more at the higher, cooler locations near its northern end. Most precipitation is in the winter months. Desert conditions are relieved by a heavy fog that blankets the higher slopes during much of the year and the fog drip which adds to the moisture available for vegetation. The only reliable source of fresh water on the island is one small spring located in the northeastern part of the island. About 100 seasonal fishermen live on the island.

The entire preserve is within the waters of the California Current which is highly productive of sea life. The cold current moderates average temperatures on the island which range at sea level from 15 °C (59 °F) in January, the coolest month, to 20 °C (68 °F) in September, the warmest month.

== Flora and fauna ==
According to the National Biodiversity Information System of Comisión Nacional para el Conocimiento y Uso de la Biodiversidad (CONABIO) in Guadalupe Island Biosphere Reserve there are over 925 plant and animal species from which 36 are in at risk category and 60 are exotics.

=== Flora ===
In 2005, 223 species of vascular plants had been found on Guadalupe Island of which 39 were endemic. Included among those plants were five trees, three of them endemic: Guadalupe cypress (Cupress guadalupensis guadalupensis), Guadalupe pine (Pinus radiata var binata), and Guadalupe palm (Brahea edulis), Island oak (Querces tomantella), and California juniper (Juniperus Californica).

The introduction of goats on the island by whalers or seal hunters in the early 19th century was catastrophic for the native vegetation. No predators, except occasional humans, controlled the goat population and it quickly multiplied to an estimated 100,000 by 1870 before declining as the goats ate most of the vegetation. Human visitors also introduced about 61 exotic species of plants which replaced the native vegetation with the result that more than 20 native species became extinct or endangered. By the time that the biosphere reserve was created in 2005, 41 percent of the island was barren of vegetation. Before the introduction of goats, forest and woodland covered about 15 percent of the land, but by 2000 less than one percent. The survival of many species was doubtful. In 2000, only 130 of Guadalupe Island pine still survived, having declined from 360 in 1966. Only 20 Island Oak survived plus a few hundred Guadalupe palms and 4,000 Guadalupe cypress. Only ten California juniper survived. Scientists believed that the possibilities for survival of the remnant forests were poor due to soil erosion, poor conditions for reproduction, and the potential for wildfires. The forests were located in the northern third of the island which is higher and wetter than the more southern parts. In the central portion of the island, the native grasses had been largely replaced by exotic species. In the southern third, characterized by desert scrub, much of the land was barren.

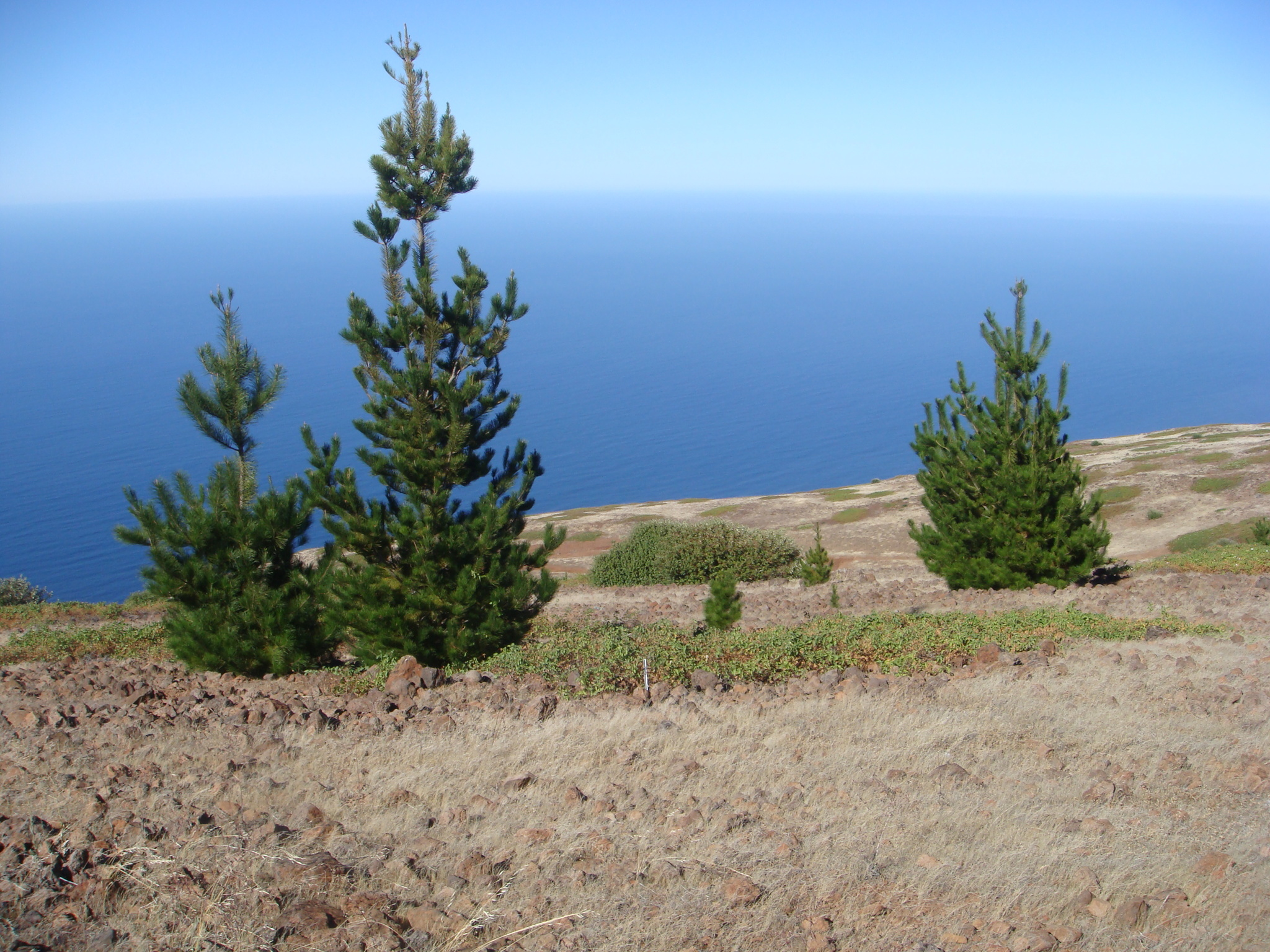
Young pines have thrived since the elimination of goats from the island.

The first task for restoration of vegetation was to rid the island of goats. Most were captured and transported to the mainland for distribution to farmers. In 2007, the island became goat-free. Ten years later much of the vegetation was recovering. Seedlings of Guadalupe Island Pine numbered several thousand. A shrub, Ceanothus arboreus, had been rediscovered. Native vegetation was replacing introduced vegetation and formerly barren areas were now covered with desert scrub. After ten years of observation, the Mexican government began active restoration programs in 2015 focused on reforestation, erosion control and fire prevention. A nursery located near the center of the island grows seedlings of native and endemic species, especially trees, and by 2018 had produced 90,000 plants.

=== Fauna ===
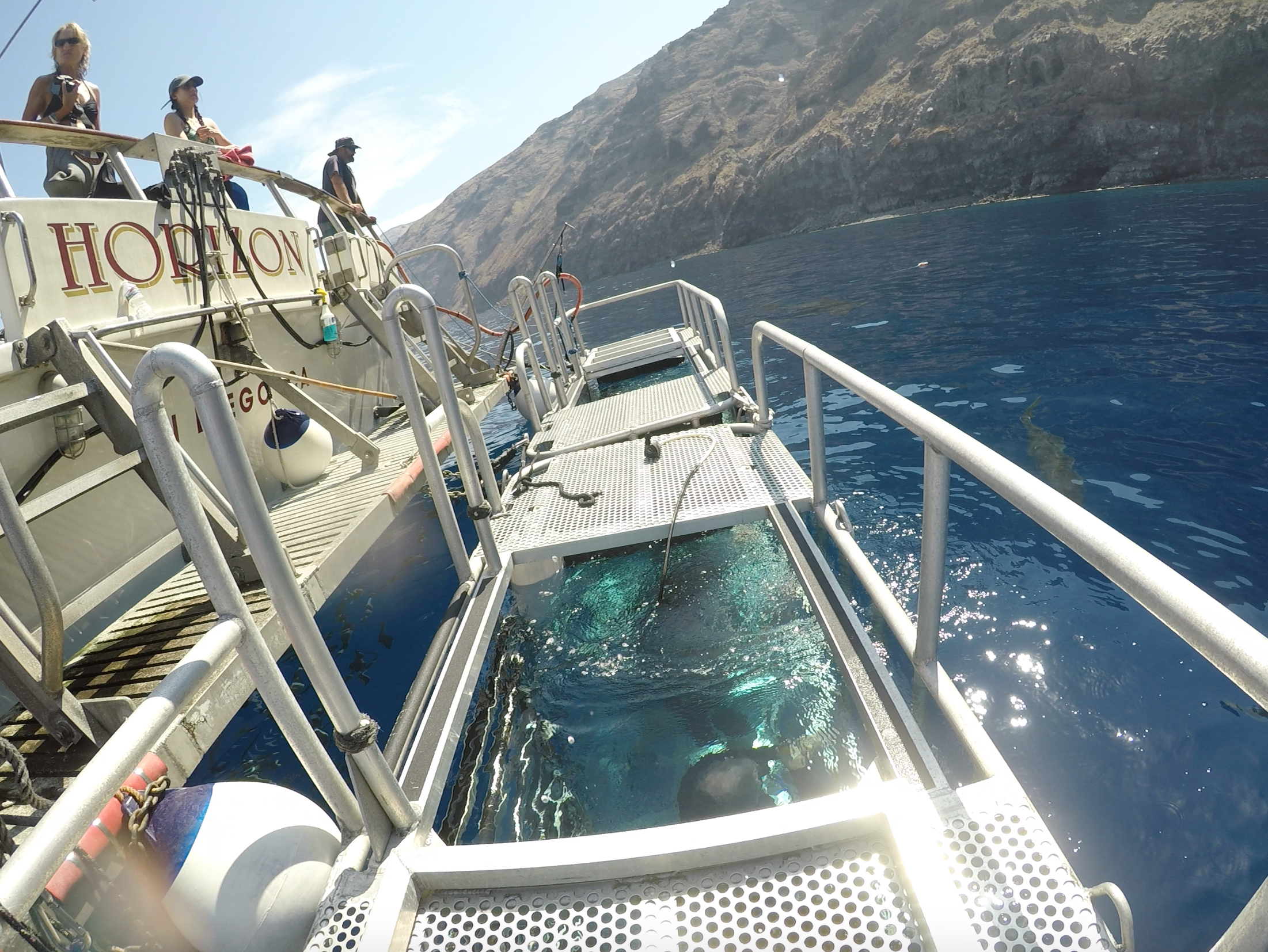
A shark cage diving expedition at Guadalupe Island

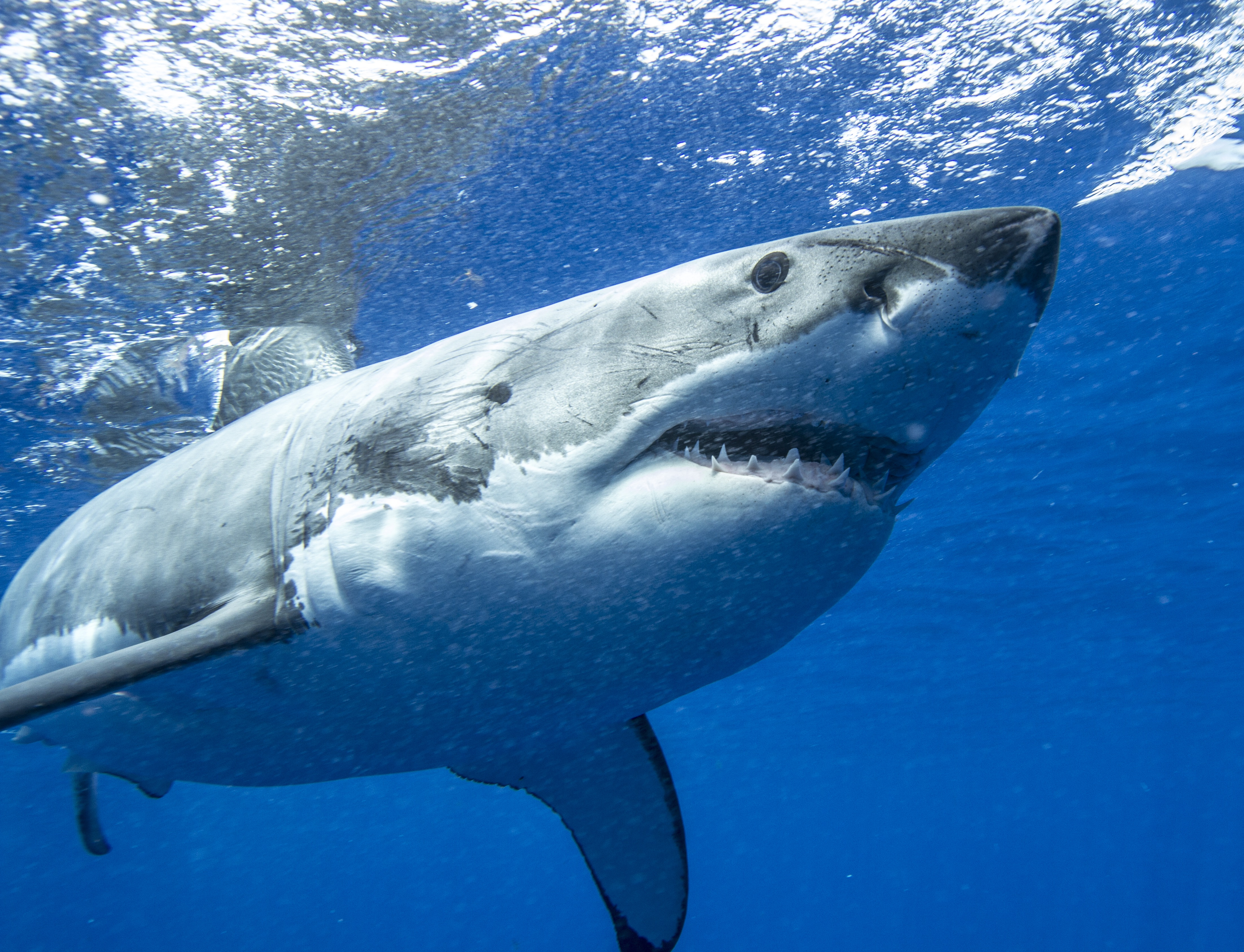

The waters and coastlines around Guadalupe Island are the home to three species of pinnipeds. Two of them were saved from extinction because isolated colonies survived on Guadalupe. The Guadalupe fur seal (Arctocephalus townsendi) and the northern elephant seal (Mirounga angustirostris) were believed to be extinct in the late 19th century, the result of over-exploitation by hunters for their pelts and oil. A few Guadalupe fur seals were discovered in 1954 living in a cave on the island. In 1892 the last two known northern elephant seals were seen on Guadalupe Island. A few more were likely present in nearby waters. From that low point—and despite scientists killing several seals for scientific purposes—the herd increased to 366 in 1923 and 469 in 1929. The population of both species has increased. In 2015, 10,000 northern elephant seals were estimated to live on Guadalupe Island and 40,000 Guadalupe fur seals were estimated to inhabit the Pacific Islands of Mexico, including Guadalupe.

Introduced feral cats (Felis catus) have caused the extinction of six species of birds on Guadalupe Island. About 400 cats remained on the island in 2015 despite an eradication program. Cats are anticipated to be eradicated by about 2025. With the reduction in the number of cats, the bird population, especially of seabirds has increased. In 2009, 27 species of seabirds no longer inhabited the Pacific islands of Mexico, including Guadalupe, but between 2010 and 2020 twenty-two species returned to the islands. The Laysan albatross is a species highly vulnerable to predation. In 2015 an area with 220 albatross nests had been fenced off at the southern tip of the island to protect the nests from cats. Eradication programs for introduced mice, the principal food of the cats, are also underway.

== Great white sharks ==
Most of the tourists who visit Guadalupe Island come by boat for shark cage diving to see the great white shark in its habitat. More than 300 great white sharks are known to frequent the clear waters of Guadalupe, mostly on the northeastern coast. Male sharks arrive at the island in July and females in September and they remain near the island until February when they migrate about 1,600 kilometres (990 miles) westward to the White Shark Café in the Pacific Ocean between Guadalupe Island and Hawaii, making the journey in about 16 days. Individual sharks usually return to Guadalupe Island periodically.

As of January 10, 2023, cage diving with great white sharks at Isla Guadalupe, Mexico, was permanently prohibited. The Mexican Government’s ban covers all tourism inside the reserve, including film production and liveaboard diving.
