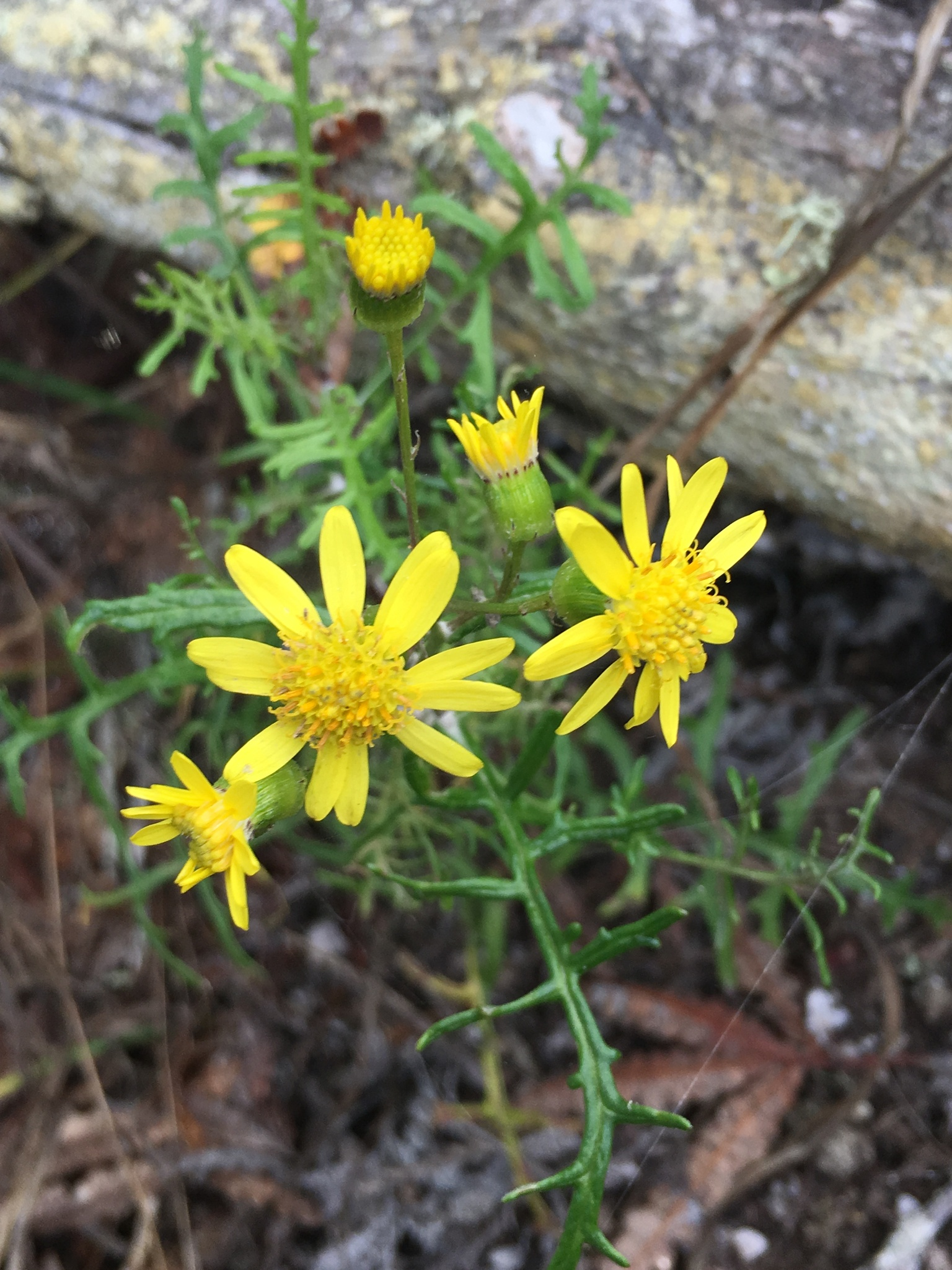

Scientific classification
- Kingdom: Plantae
- Clade: Tracheophytes
- Clade: Angiosperms
- Clade: Eudicots
- Clade: Asterids
- Order: Asterales
- Family: Asteraceae
- Genus: Senecio
- Species: S. lyonii

Binomial name
- Senecio lyonii A.Gray

= Senecio lyonii =

Species of flowering plant

Senecio lyonii is an uncommon species of flowering plant in the aster family known by the common name island senecio. This island endemic is known only from Guadalupe Island off the coast of Baja California and two of the Channel Islands of California, Catalina and San Clemente Islands. It grows in the coastal sage scrub and chaparral of the islands' hills and canyons. It is a shrub or subshrub growing from a woody taproot and reaching top heights well over one meter. The leaves have blades up to 12 centimeters long which are divided deeply into many narrow lobes. The inflorescence is made up of many clusters of flower heads. Each head has narrow phyllaries usually tipped with black, yellow disc florets and a fringe of yellow ray florets each about a centimeter long.

== See also ==
- Flora of The Channel Islands of California
