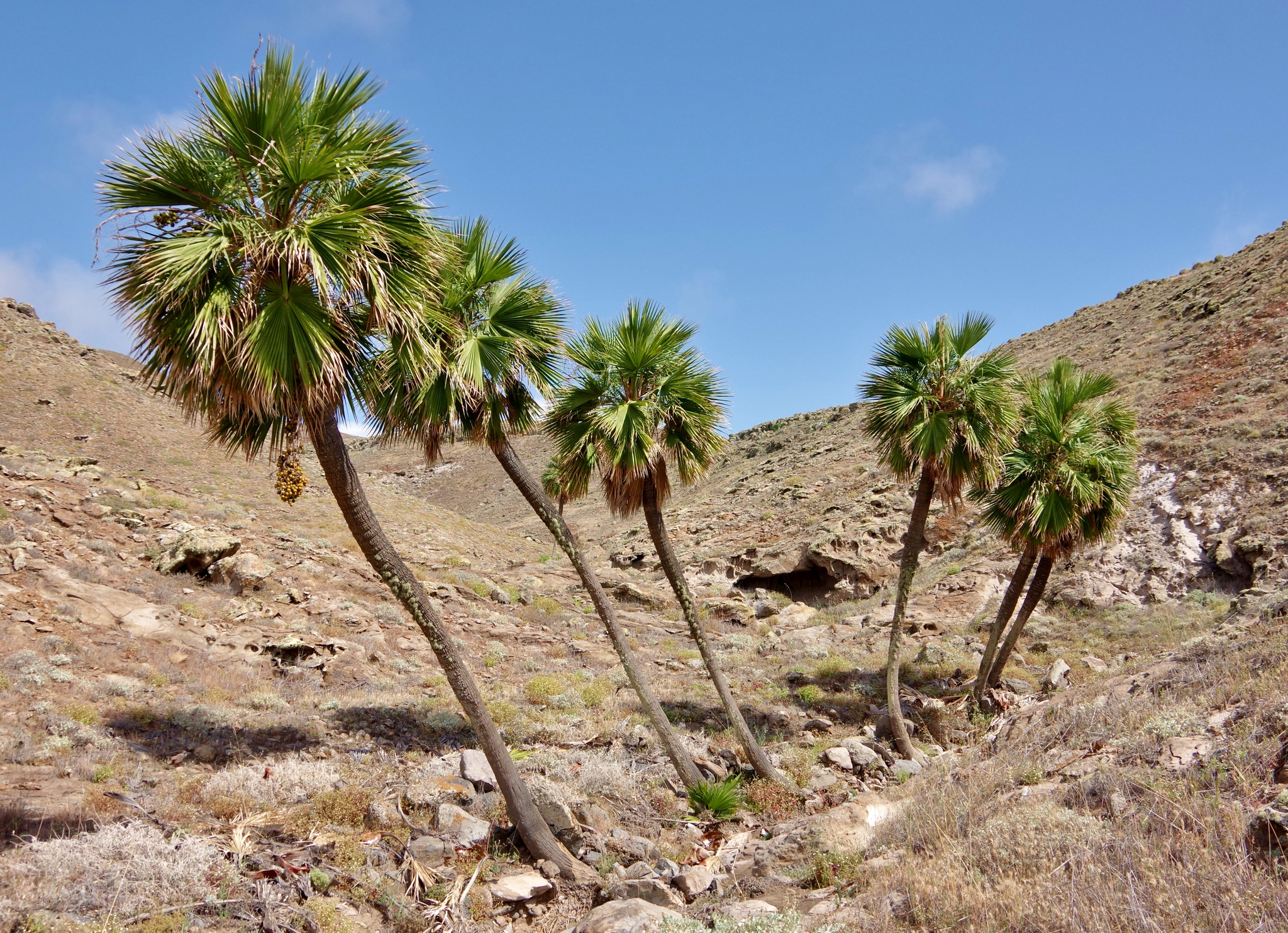
- In habitat, Guadalupe Island

Conservation status
- Least Concern (IUCN 3.1)

Scientific classification
- Kingdom: Plantae
- Clade: Tracheophytes
- Clade: Angiosperms
- Clade: Monocots
- Clade: Commelinids
- Order: Arecales
- Family: Arecaceae
- Tribe: Trachycarpeae
- Genus: Brahea
- Species: B. edulis

Binomial name
- Brahea edulis H.Wendl.

= Brahea edulis =

Species of palm

Brahea edulis, the Guadalupe palm or palma de Guadalupe, is a palm endemic to Guadalupe Island, Mexico, although a few stands have been planted elsewhere. It is a fan palm which grows 4.50 to 13 metres (15 to 43 ft) tall. It grows on the island between 400 and 1,000 metres (1,300 and 3,300 ft) above mean sea level (ASL), with this altitudinal zonation producing one of the few fog oases present in North America.

== Distribution and habitat ==
Brahea edulis is endemic to Guadalupe Island, Mexico, found in a monospecific grove around 20 hectares in area between 400 and 1,000 metres (1,300 and 3,300 ft) ASL on the north end of the island The scarped terrain, along with the maritime climate of the island, produces one of the few true fog oases in North America. The mainland Baja California desert is influenced by fog, but the effect is greatly diluted by the lack of steep topography. Although the island's rainfall is low, about 133 mm (5.2 in) per year, the effect of the fog and the topography produces an environment similar to the lomas of South America.

The entire native population consists of old trees with little successful recruitment for 150 years or so. Until 2007, Guadalupe Island supported a large goat population (estimated at 100,000 in 1870, and 5,000 in 2000). The presence of these goats prevented regrowth of the native trees, including B. edulis, and as a consequence, the ecosystem was drastically altered: the once verdant island turned into an almost barren rock, with weeds replacing the former forests. Below 800–900 m (2,600–3,000 ft) ASL, the palm is essentially the only remaining tree, occurring in a major subpopulation and scattered groups in sheltered locations. Above that, there used to be a band of mixed woodland where the palm was accompanied by Island Oak and Guadalupe Pine. This habitat has now all but disappeared due to the other trees becoming pushed back into higher regions.

== Conservation ==
The species was probably declining slowly since the mid-19th century. Its range might even have expanded a bit until the mid-20th century however; part of it was shared with other trees as noted above; especially the pine, which is a towering species that presumably grew in many sites now occupied by the palm. In addition, a forest of Guadalupe Cypress and California Juniper shrubland existed in the palm's present range; the cypress forest was eventually destroyed by the goats and the juniper is nowadays completely absent from the island.

Although threatened in the wild, B. edulis is cultivated, especially in California. In 2001, it was started to fence in patches of habitat on Guadalupe, and the long-envisioned removal of goats was effectively complete by 2005. Some hundreds of Guadalupe Palms remain on their island home today. As regrowth presumably was hindered by the goats eating the saplings rather than the trees having all become old and sterile, it is likely that the palm will eventually recover. That it was best able of all Guadalupe tree species to withstand the hordes of goats is evidenced by its present distribution; the other trees – if they survive at all – are limited to higher and less accessible areas.
