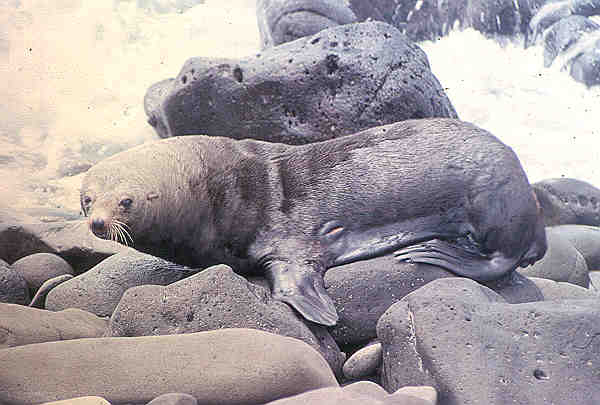

Conservation status
- Least Concern (IUCN 3.1)
- CITES Appendix I

Scientific classification
- Kingdom: Animalia
- Phylum: Chordata
- Class: Mammalia
- Order: Carnivora
- Parvorder: Pinnipedia
- Family: Otariidae
- Genus: Arctocephalus
- Species: A. townsendi

Binomial name
- Arctocephalus townsendi Merriam, 1897
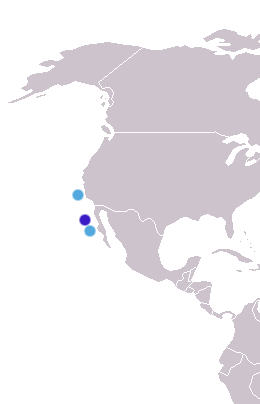
- Dark blue: breeding colonies; light blue: other colonies

= Guadalupe fur seal =

Species of carnivore

The Guadalupe fur seal (Arctocephalus townsendi) is one of eight members of the fur seal genus Arctocephalus. They are the northernmost members of this genus. Sealers reduced the population to just a few dozen by the late 19th century, but the species had recovered to about 10,000 individuals by the late 1990s. Many individuals can be found on Mexico's Guadalupe Island.

== Description ==
Adult Guadalupe fur seals are dark brown or dusty gray with yellowish silver manes, called guard hairs, on the back of the neck. Guadalupe fur seals are sexually dimorphic in size, as males are much larger and heavier than females; males can grow to about seven feet in length and weigh upwards of 400 pounds, while females are typically only five feet long and weigh about 110 pounds. Additionally, males usually have a larger head and are lighter brown in color. Both males and females have a twenty-year lifespan. Guadalupe fur seals have distinctive ear flaps and large flippers for walking on land, confirming that they are not phocids (true seals) but are more closely related to sea lions. Guadalupe fur seal pups are born with black coats similar to those of adult Guadalupe fur seals, but it is difficult to distinguish juvenile Guadalupe fur seals from juveniles of California sea lions and Northern fur seals due to physiological similarities.

== Distribution and habitat ==
Guadalupe fur seals breed along the eastern coast of Guadalupe Island, approximately 200 km west of Baja California. In addition, individuals have been sighted in the southern California Channel Islands, including two males who established territories on San Nicolas Island. A stray seal has been found as far north as Oregon and a deceased seal has been found as far north as British Columbia.

Guadalupe fur seals were known to reside in Baja California, Mexico and Southern California but were heavily hunted in the 19th century and were believed to be extinct. However, the animals were found on Isla Guadalupe, Baja California in a cave in 1954; this is now the only place where Guadalupe fur seals reproduce. In 2013, the population of Guadalupe fur seals was estimated to be between 34,000 and 44,000, around one-fifth of the estimated historical population size.

== Feeding ==
Guadalupe fur seals are a pelagic species that spend most of their time in the open ocean. Thus, they dive to catch food and forage for about two weeks before returning to land to feed. Guadalupe fur seals commonly hunt in shallow water (maximum depth of 250 feet/76 meters) and catch squid, mackerels, and lanternfish. They feed exclusively at night.

== Behavior ==
Guadalupe fur seals create caves on land which can cause social pressures amongst the individuals. The seals that do not breed often play with each other by barking, lunging at each other, and pushing each other into the water. Other behaviors of the species consist of waving their hind flippers in the water while face down in the water. Additionally, when interacting with humans, these seals are not typically aggressive. They are often seen with their heads under the water and pay little attention to the observer.

== Breeding ==
Observations suggest that males of reproducing age claim particular sites for a number of years, though territorial fights are uncommon amongst males once regions have been taken. Tenure of territorial males lasts from 35 to 122 days. Males mate with up to twelve females during mating season, and births occur from mid-June through mid-July, though most births take place in June. After birth, females nurse their pups for 8–10 days. In the nine months following the birth, females alternate between spending 9–13 days foraging food for and spending 5–6 days nursing pups. After this period, the pups are considered adults and are on their own. Mothers and pups recognize each other by unique noises and smells.

== Impacts on Guadalupe fur seals ==
The major cause of the Guadalupe fur seal's decline was commercial hunting in the late 18th and early 19th centuries. The species was exterminated in southern California waters by 1825. Commercial sealing continued in Mexican waters through 1894.

== Conservation and recovery efforts ==
The species is listed as Threatened by the U.S. National Marine Fisheries Service under the Endangered Species Act. The principal cause of the decline in Guadalupe fur seals was commercial sealing. The species is now protected from such activity throughout its range, and the magnitude of the threat to the species is considered to be low. The portion of the Guadalupe fur seal's range which is under U.S. jurisdiction is at the limit of the species range. No activities in areas under U.S. jurisdiction are known to be adversely affecting recovery of this species now. Therefore, management activities in the U.S. portion of its range are not likely to contribute substantially to recovery. However, Guadalupe fur seals are protected from federal actions that are likely to jeopardize the species through interagency coordination under Section 7 of the Endangered Species Act. No other specific actions necessary for the recovery of the species have been identified, and no direct recovery actions are being implemented.

In Mexico, the Guadalupe fur seal, where the seal was discovered after being believed to be extinct, is protected in the Guadalupe Island Biosphere Reserve.
