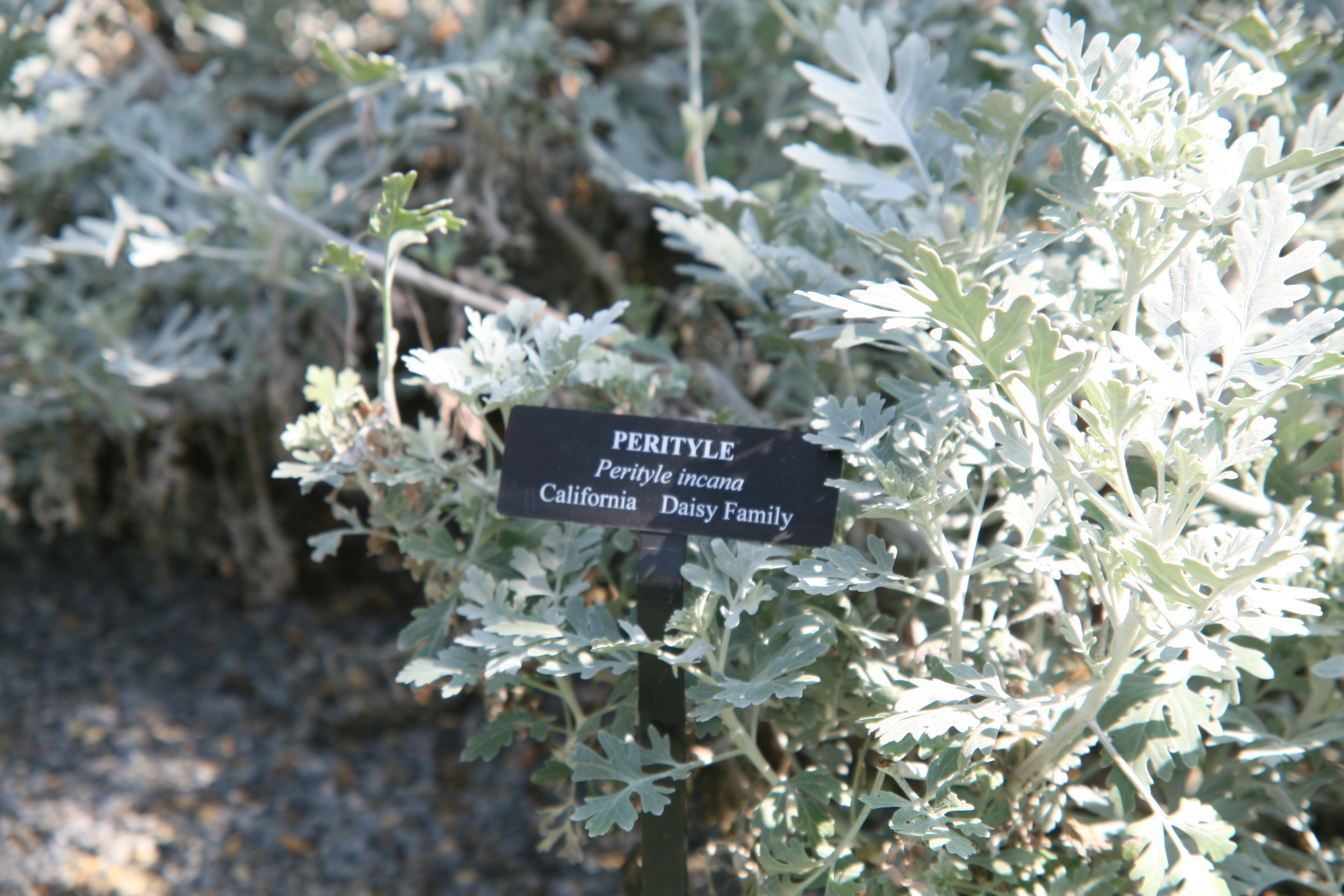
- Nesothamnus incanus at Longwood Gardens, Pennsylvania

Scientific classification
- Kingdom: Plantae
- Clade: Tracheophytes
- Clade: Angiosperms
- Clade: Eudicots
- Clade: Asterids
- Order: Asterales
- Family: Asteraceae
- Genus: Nesothamnus; Rydb. (1914)
- Species: N. incanus

Binomial name
- Nesothamnus incanus (A.Gray) Rydb. (1914)

Synonyms
- Perityle incana A.Gray (1876)

= Nesothamnus =

Species of flowering plant

Nesothamnus incanus is a species of flowering plant in the family Asteraceae. It is endemic to Guadalupe Island, a Mexican Pacific island off the west coast of Baja California.

The species was first named Perityle incana by Asa Gray in 1876. In 1914 Per Axel Rydberg placed it in the monotypic genus Nesothamnus as Nesothamnus incanus.
