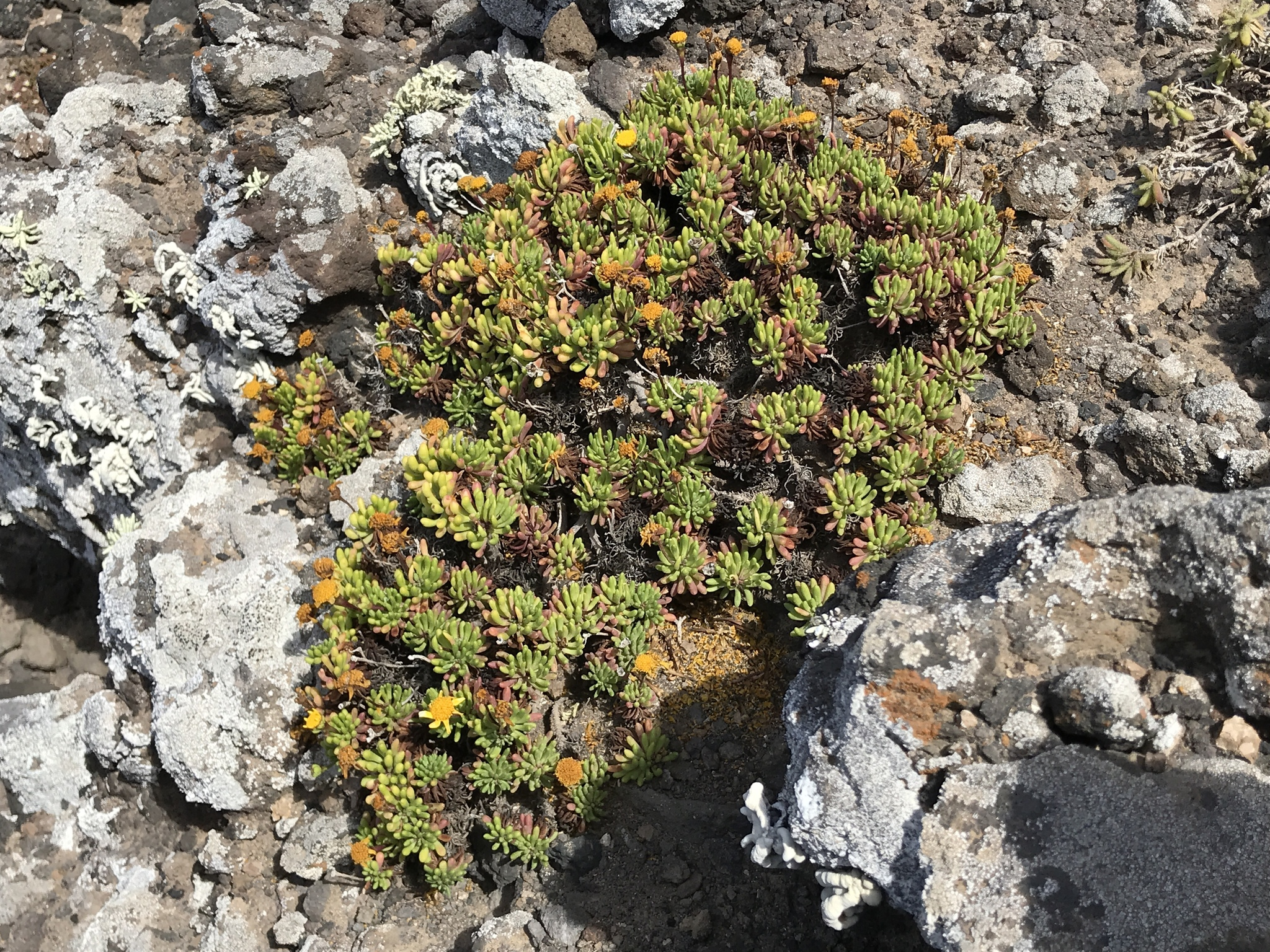

Scientific classification
- Kingdom: Plantae
- Clade: Tracheophytes
- Clade: Angiosperms
- Clade: Eudicots
- Clade: Asterids
- Order: Asterales
- Family: Asteraceae
- Subfamily: Asteroideae
- Tribe: Madieae
- Subtribe: Baeriinae
- Genus: Baeriopsis; J.T.Howell
- Species: B. guadalupensis

Binomial name
- Baeriopsis guadalupensis J.T.Howell

= Baeriopsis =

Genus of flowering plants

Baeriopsis is a monotypic genus of flowering plants in the family Asteraceae, containing the single species Baeriopsis guadalupensis. It is endemic to the Guadalupe Island archipelago along the coast of Baja California in Mexico. It grows in Guadalupe mesa scrub habitat.

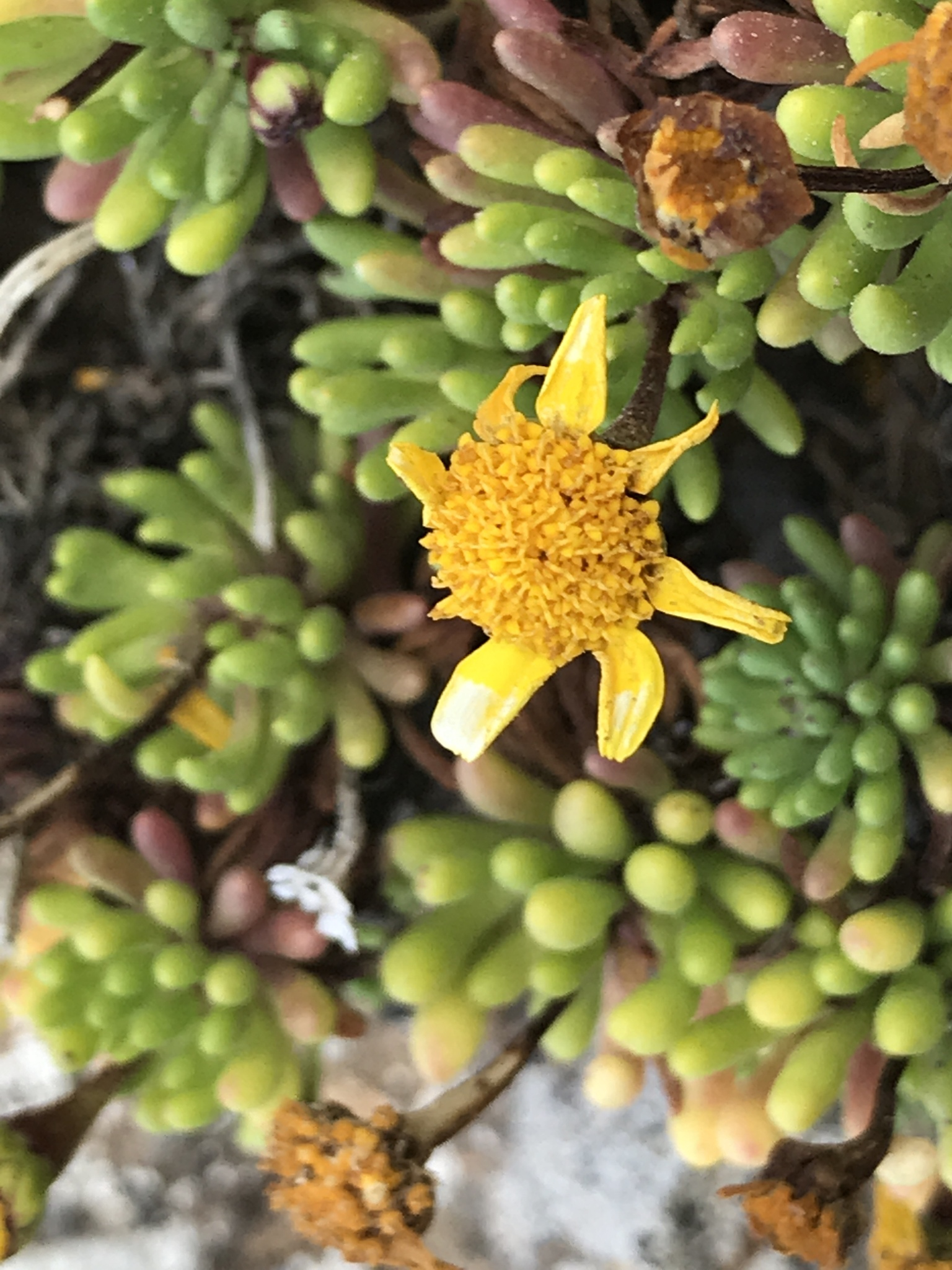
The flower and succulent leaves
