= Guadalupe wren =

Scientific classification
- Kingdom: Animalia
- Phylum: Chordata
- Class: Aves
- Order: Passeriformes
- Family: Troglodytidae
- Genus: Thryomanes
- Species: T. bewickii
- Subspecies: T. b. brevicauda

Trinomial name
- Thryomanes bewickii brevicauda (Ridgway, 1876)

Subspecies of bird

The Guadalupe wren (Thryomanes bewickii brevicauda), also known as the Guadalupe Island wren, is a subspecies of Bewick's wren native to the island of Guadalupe, off the western coast of Baja California. It is potentially extinct; it has not been seen since 1897.

== Taxonomy and description ==
Ornithologist Robert Ridgway initially described the Guadalupe wren as a species – Thryomanes brevicauda. Its closest relative may be the mainland Bewick's wren subspecies T. b. correctus, which the Guadalupe wren closely resembled. Brevicauda mainly differed from correctus in its narrower tail bars, smaller size, shorter tail, and longer bill.

== Biology ==
The diet of the Guadalupe wren remains poorly known. One collected specimen had two insects in its stomach, and another contained an insect and some pine seeds. Guadalupe wrens likely foraged in the scrub habitat on the island. Their nest has never been found, nor have any eggs. The subspecies was a reclusive yet active one, quickly moving about among dense branches from fallen trees.

== Extinction ==
The Guadalupe wren was last seen alive in 1897 by researcher Henry Kaeding. Though the reason for its extinction is not clear, introduced species likely led to the bird's decline. Goats introduced to Guadalupe preferentially fed upon the sagebrush plants relied on as foraging habitat by the wrens, and introduced cats may have fed upon them. It is also possible that specimen collection may have also played a role in the extinction. The last known individuals were encountered in Monterey pines on the northern ridge of Guadalupe.
