= Cistanthe guadalupensis =

Scientific classification
- Kingdom: Plantae
- Clade: Tracheophytes
- Clade: Angiosperms
- Clade: Eudicots
- Order: Caryophyllales
- Family: Montiaceae
- Genus: Cistanthe
- Species: C. guadalupensis

Binomial name
- Cistanthe guadalupensis (Dudley) Carolin ex M.A. Hershkovitz

Synonyms
- Talinum guadalupense

Species of flowering plant

Cistanthe guadalupensis is a species of caudiciform succulent flowering plant in the family Montiaceae. The plant is native to Guadalupe Island. This species is extremely rare in cultivation, due to its tendency to rot in summer dormancy and its remote island location.
