= Fog desert =

Type of desert

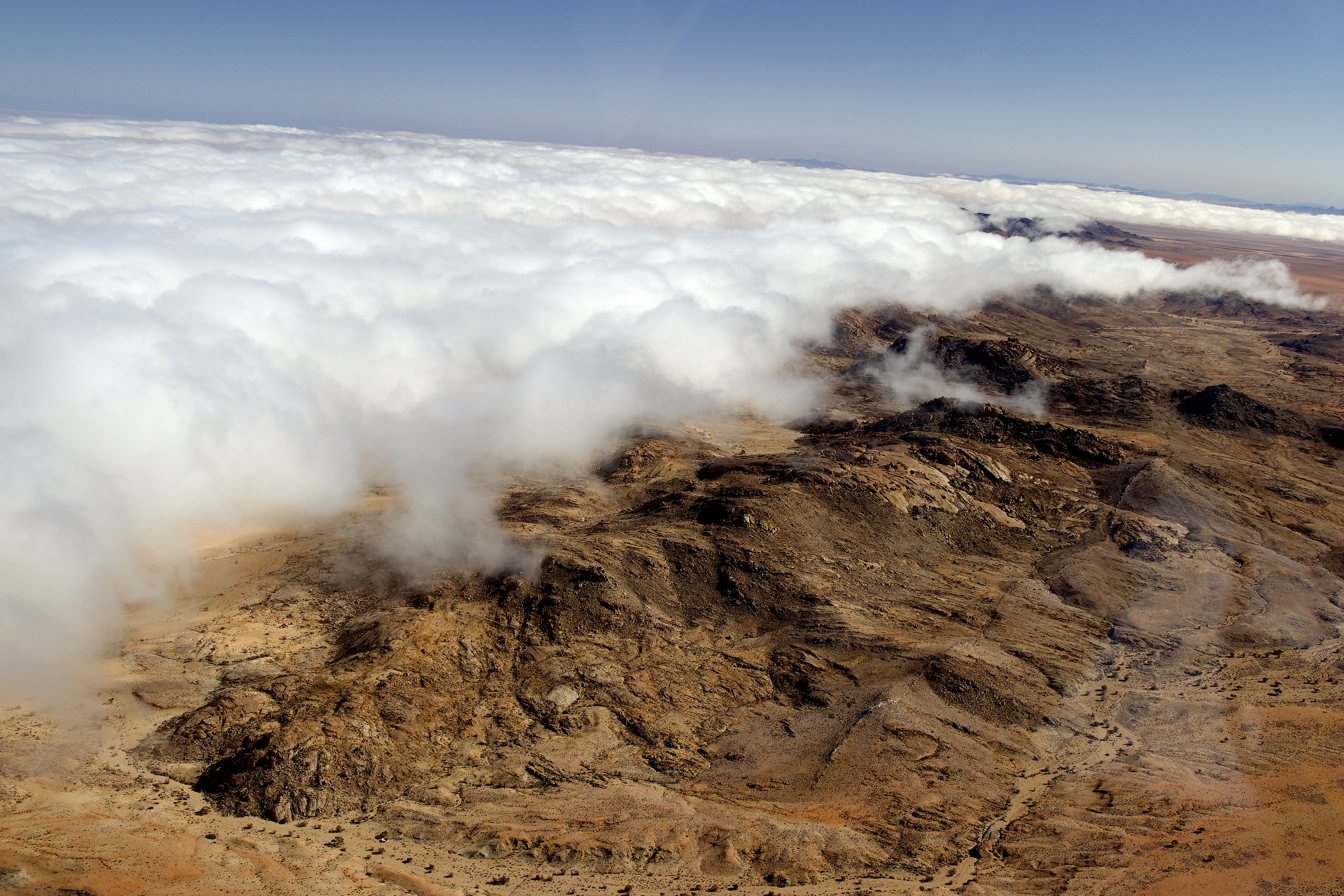
Fog from the Atlantic Ocean shifted 100 km direction east into the Namib-Desert to Aus 26°39′01″S 016°14′36″E

A fog desert is a type of desert where fog drip supplies the majority of moisture needed by animal and plant life. Examples of fog deserts include the Atacama Desert of coastal Chile and Peru; the Baja California desert of Mexico; the Namib Desert in Namibia; the Arabian Peninsula coastal fog desert; and a manmade instance within Biosphere 2, an artificial closed ecosphere in Arizona.

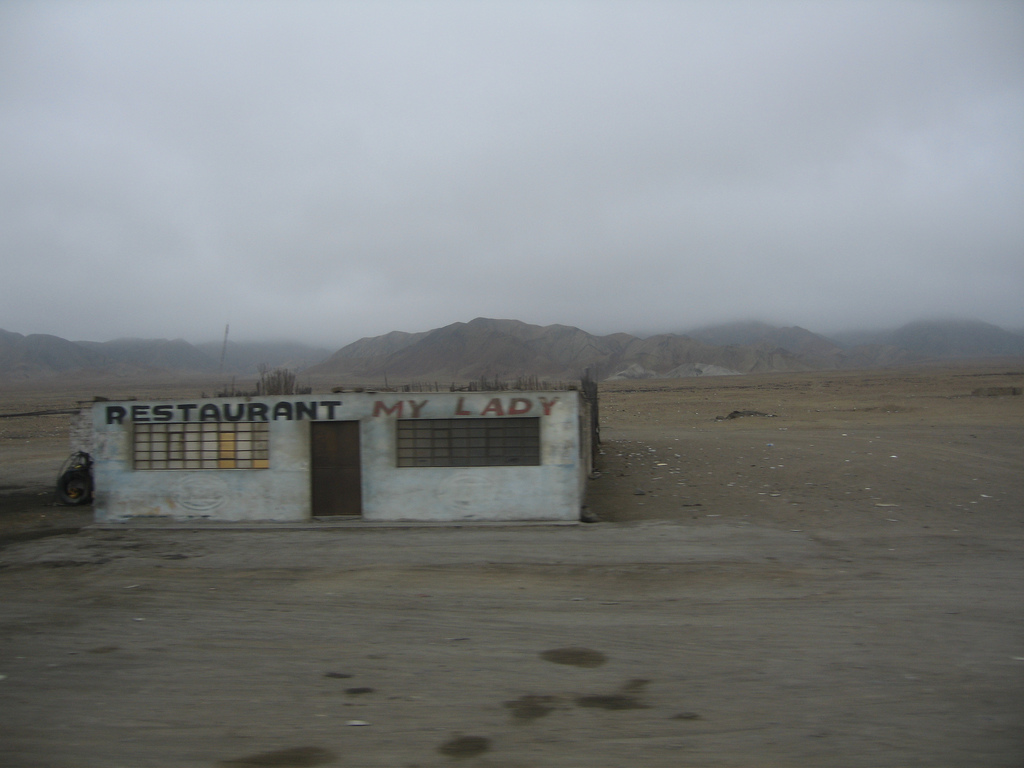
The desert between Lima and Trujillo, Peru. The Andes Mountains, obscured by fog, can be seen in the background.

== Formation ==
Humidity in foggy air is above 95%. One way for fog to form in deserts is through the interaction of hot humid air (such as is formed above warm bodies of water) with a cooler object, such as a mountain. When warm air hits cooler objects, fog is generated by the condensation of vaporized water. Another way fog forms in deserts occurs when a desert is close to an ocean which has a cold current. When air is heated over desert land and blows towards the cool water in the ocean, it condenses and fog is formed. The cool fog is then blown inland by the ocean breeze. Fog is mainly formed in the early morning or after sunset.

Drastic changes in elevation such as mountain ranges allow for maritime winds to settle in specific geographic areas, which is a common characteristic in fog deserts. The Andes mountain range which runs along the Pacific coast of South America divides Chile and Peru into inland and coastal regions, and its proximity to the sea coupled with the steep change in elevation (and thus surface temperature) allows for fog to form along the Pacific coast and supply moisture to the otherwise arid desert.

The Atacama Desert, the driest desert in the world, features lomas, areas in which fog condenses against mountain slopes near the sea and creates "fog oases" with an abundant biodiversity of plant and animal species. Plant coverage varies greatly, from coverage as high as 50% in the foggiest areas to a near-total absence of plant life above the fog line.

Within arid fog deserts with low precipitation levels, fog drip provides the moisture needed for agricultural development. The variation in humidity throughout the day and seasons within a fog desert region encourages the development of a comparable diversity of plant types and habits such as succulents, deciduous species, and woody shrub.

== Ecology ==
The species prevalent in fog deserts depend almost entirely on water contained in the fog for their survival. This has led to the development of various structural and behavioral adaptations by organisms to collect water. The Stenocara beetle, which lives in the Namib desert, climbs sand dunes when the humid wind is blowing from the ocean to access the ambient water. An example of plants adapting to the fog desert's climate is the genus Welwitschia which also grows in the Namib desert and grows only two leaves through its life. The leaves have large pores to help it absorb water from the fog forming on them.

People living in the Namib depend on techniques to collect water from fog. A lot of technologies are being developed to help extract water from desert air. Fog harvesters are undergoing improvements based on observations of the adaptations of some of the beings in fog deserts like the Stenocara beetle. Devices being developed to extract water from air desert use metal-organic framework crystals to capture and hold water molecules when exposed to air flow at night. In the morning, air flow is cut and the water collected the previous night is then vaporized by exposure to sunlight and then condensed into liquid water when it hits the cooler condenser.
