= Fog drip =

Stage of water cycle

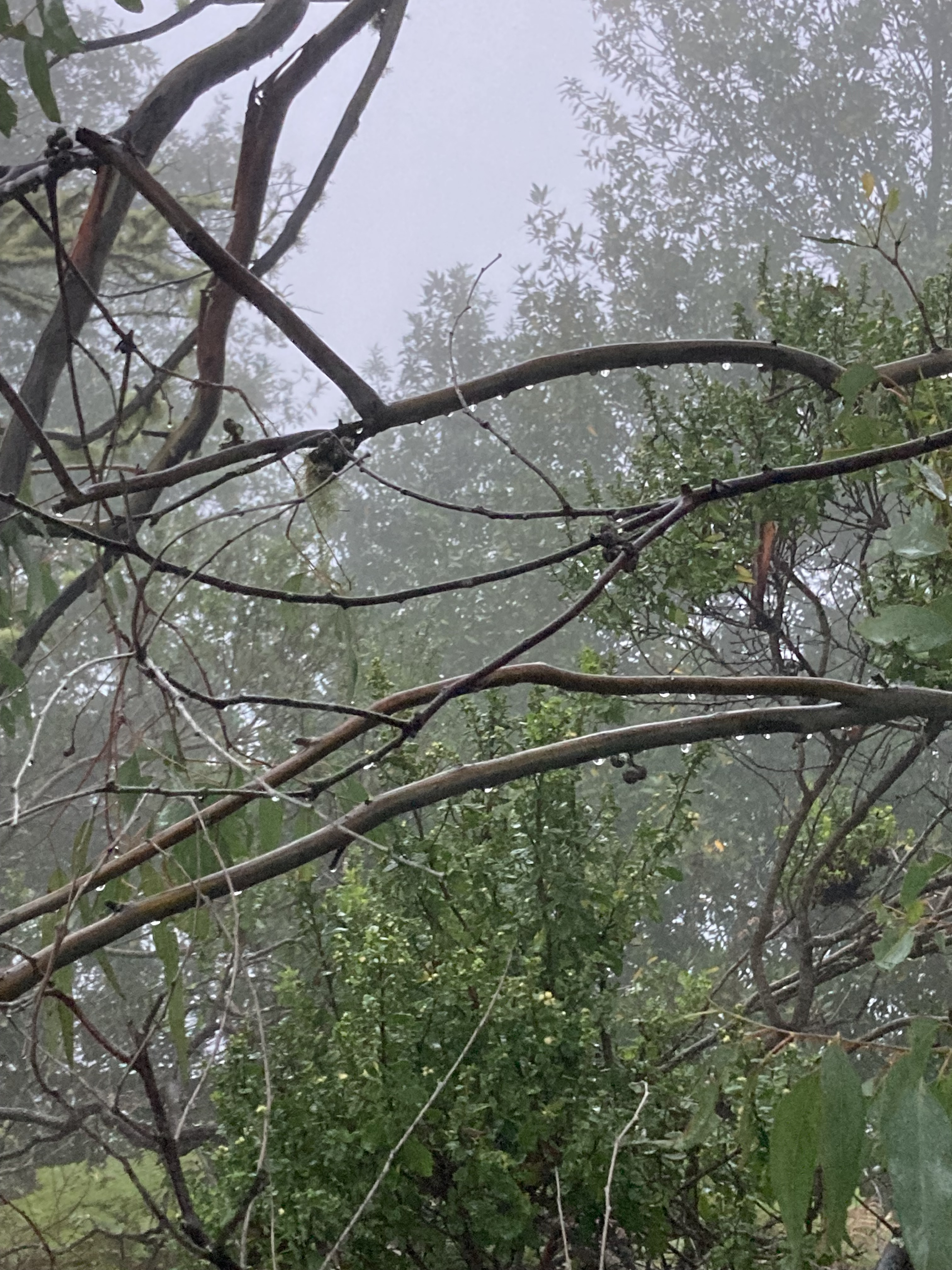
Fog condensing into droplets on branches during dense summer fog in the Berkeley Hills, California.

Fog drip is water dripping to the ground during fog. It occurs when water droplets from the fog adhere to the needles or leaves of trees or other objects, coalesce into larger drops and then drop to the ground.

Fog drip can be an important source of moisture in areas of low rainfall, or in areas that are seasonally dry.

== Studies in the United States ==
- On the leeward slopes of Maui, the original dryland cloud forests were destroyed during the 19th century but historically were inhabited by native Hawaiians, so there must have been water sources. Isotopic (Oxygen-18) analyses of one of the few remaining areas of native forest, at 4,000 feet (1,200 m) elevation in the fog belt, found that fog drip was a major component of stream flow and shallow ground water at higher altitudes in the watershed.
- On arid Santa Cruz Island, a study of the southernmost Bishop pine (Pinus muricata) forest in California found that summer cloud shading and fog drip mitigate the effects of summer drought. Even though fog cover in summer only occurs 15% of the day, this minor amount of fog enabled trees and soil microbes to grow at an increased rate. However, winter rainfall was the primary driver of summer tree growth, which is only aided by reduced soil evaporation in summer due to fog drip. Cloud cover and fog drip have enabled this relict pine forest to persist from prehistoric times when the climate was wetter.
- In the Bull Run River, Oregon, fog drip from mature Douglas fir (Pseudotsuga menziesii) forest adds 35 inches (890 mm) of moisture per year, a 41% increase over that from rain and snow, and importantly, 1/3 of all moisture in the dry May to September season.
- In California Coast Ranges, a single Coast redwood (Sequoia sempervirens) can "douse the ground beneath it with the equivalent of a drenching rainstorm and the drops off redwoods can provide as much as half the moisture coming into a forest over a year". Dawson reported that in a study of northern California redwood forests, 34% of annual hydrologic input was from fog drip. In areas where trees had been cut down, the average annual input from fog was only 17%, proving that the redwoods were required for the fog moisture input to the ecosystem. In an Occidental, California study beneath a single 200-foot-tall (61 m) Douglas fir on a ridge dividing the moister western slope of the California Coast Range from the drier eastern slope, moisture collected under the tree averaged 58 inches (1,500 mm) versus 27 inches (690 mm) in an adjacent open meadow. On Inverness Ridge in Point Reyes National Seashore fog drip from Douglas firs in summer may add 20 inches (510 mm) to the otherwise 40 inches (1,000 mm) of annual average rainfall. Further south, on Cahill Ridge on the San Francisco Peninsula (between Pilarcitos Creek and Crystal Springs Reservoir) at an altitude of 1,000 feet (300 m), Oberlander measured fog drip beneath Tanoak (Lithocarpus densiflorus), Coast redwood and three Douglas fir trees, the latter 125 feet (38 m) tall. He found that the trees most exposed produced the most moisture and in five weeks of measurement (July 20–August 28, 1951) fog drip below the tanoak produced 59 inches (1,500 mm) of moisture, more than the total annual precipitation on nearby grasslands and chaparral. The Douglas fir produced 7–17 inches (180–430 mm) of fog drip and appeared to provide unique conditions supporting the orchids Giant helleborine (Epipactis gigantea) and Phantom orchid (Cephalanthera austiniae), since these plants were found exclusively in these moist ridge tops.
- In the Green Mountains of northern Vermont at elevations above 2,500 feet (760 m) in the spruce–fir zone on the western slope of Camel's Hump, fog drip increased the total moisture available up to 67% over rainfall alone. The authors concluded that the needlelike leaves and twiggy character of the conifers in the spruce–fir zone serve as effective mechanical collectors of the wind-driven cloud droplets.

== Outside the United States ==
- One of the few areas in the world where people climb to the hilltops to get water in times of drought is the Downs in England, where fog blows in from the English Channel to form what locals call "dew ponds", although they are formed by fog drip instead of dew.
- Near the Pacific coast of Peru and northern Chile, in the nearly complete absence of any annual rainfall, fog drip allows vegetation, including trees, to grow in small areas called "Lomas," which contrast with the surrounding areas of barren desert.
- In the arid climate of northern Kenya, fog drip may be an important source of infiltration and groundwater recharge, where isotopic analysis found the latter to be a mixture of rainwater and fog drip.
- In the Pacific Ocean off Mexico, Cedros and Guadalupe Islands support Monterey pine forests. Very sparse rainfall augmented by fog drip permits the existence of the forests.

== See also ==
- Fog desert
- Cloud forest
- Dew
