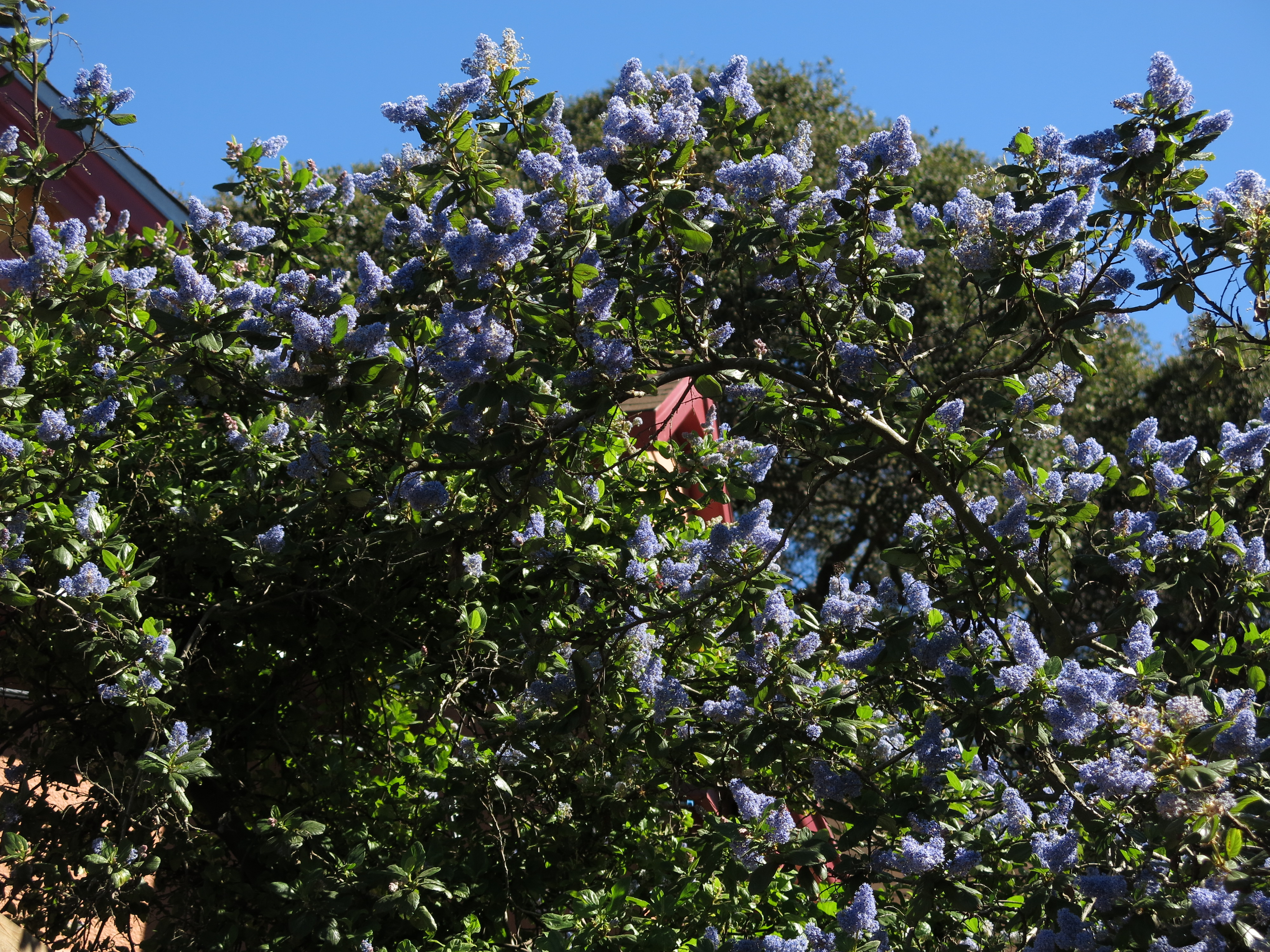

Conservation status
- Vulnerable (NatureServe)

Scientific classification
- Kingdom: Plantae
- Clade: Tracheophytes
- Clade: Angiosperms
- Clade: Eudicots
- Clade: Rosids
- Order: Rosales
- Family: Rhamnaceae
- Genus: Ceanothus
- Species: C. arboreus

Binomial name
- Ceanothus arboreus Greene
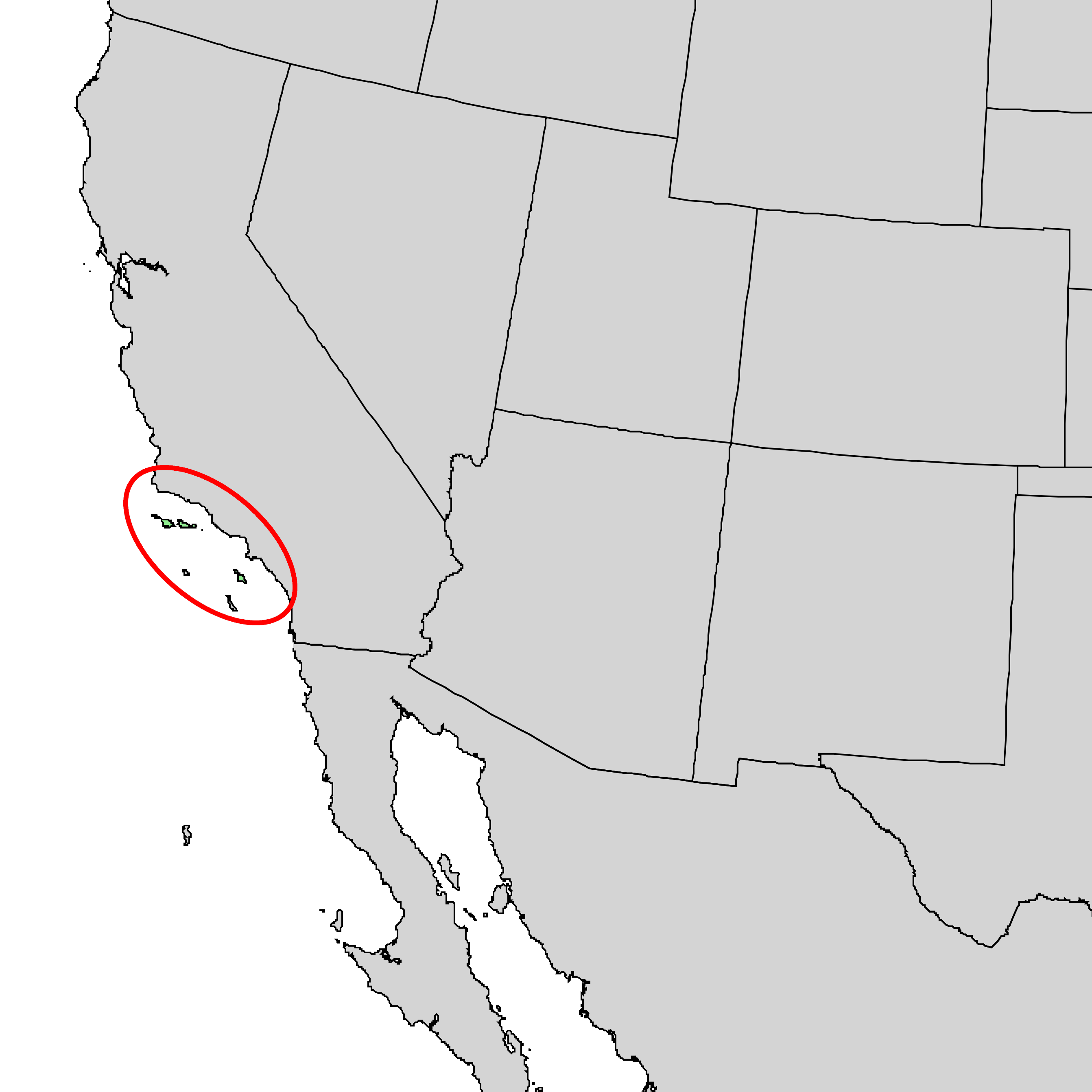
- Natural range of Ceanothus arboreus

= Ceanothus arboreus =

Species of flowering plant

Ceanothus arboreus is a species of perennial shrub to small tree in the family Rhamnaceae, commonly known as the feltleaf ceanothus, island ceanothus, and island mountain lilac. It is the largest member of the California lilacs (the Ceanothus genus), and is characterized with glossy, dark green foliage that is adorned by pale blue to white flowers in bloom. It is endemic to the Channel Islands of California and Guadalupe Island in Mexico, only being re-discovered on Guadalupe Island after the elimination of feral goats.

== Description ==
Ceanothus arboreus is a spreading bush growing up to 12–36 feet (3.7–11.0 m) in height. It has large, glossy, dark green leaves which are leathery or felt-like on their undersides.

Its showy bright blue flowers grow in plentiful panicles, or bunches, of tiny five-lobed blossoms. Some varieties and cultivars have light, powder purple blooms, and others bear darker purple flowers. The bloom period is February to April.

The fruits are three-lobed, triangular capsules.

== Distribution ==
The plant is endemic to three of the Channel Islands of California: Santa Cruz Island, Santa Rosa Island, and Santa Catalina Island, and it is also found on Guadalupe Island in Mexico.

It is found on slopes in coastal sage scrub and chaparral habitats.

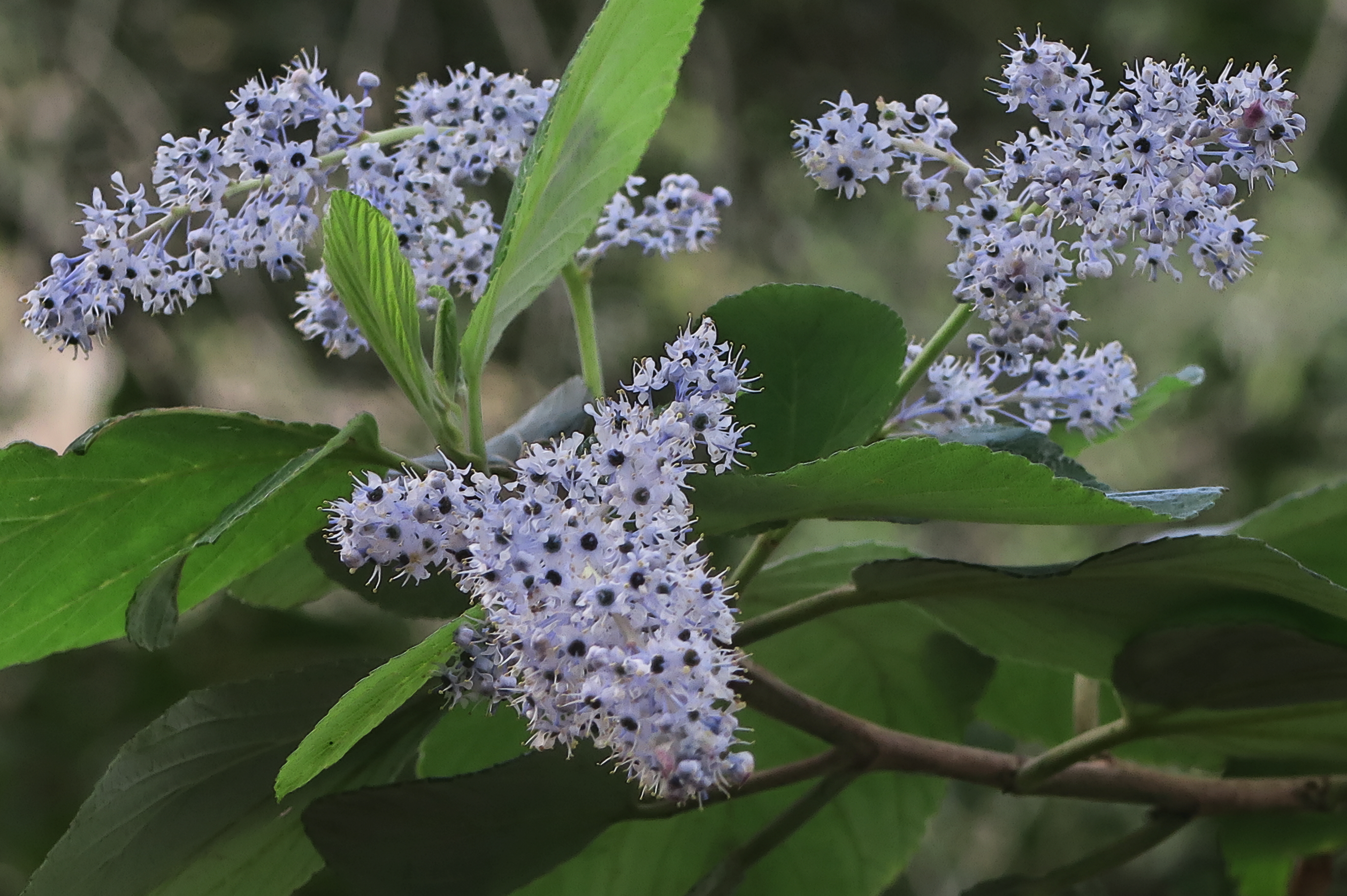

== Cultivation ==
'Ceanothus arboreus is cultivated as an ornamental plant for use in drought tolerant and wildlife gardens and natural landscaping projects. Butterflies like the flowers and the quail eat the seeds.

=== Cultivars ===
Numerous cultivars have been selected for garden use, including:

- Ceanothus arboreus 'Cliff Schmidt' — more compact habit and deeper blue flowers.
- Ceanothus arboreus 'Owlswood Blue'.
- Ceanothus arboreus 'Powder Blue' — Powder Blue Ceanothus, Compact Feltleaf Ceanothus.
- Ceanothus arboreus 'Skylark'
- Ceanothus arboreus 'Trewithen Blue' — very dark blue flowered form from the Channel Islands. It has received the Royal Horticultural Society's Award of Garden Merit.

== See also ==
- Endemic flora of California
- Natural history of the Channel Islands of California
- Flora of the California chaparral and woodlands
