= Guadalupe Island =

Mexican island in the Pacific Ocean

Guadalupe
Isla Guadalupe
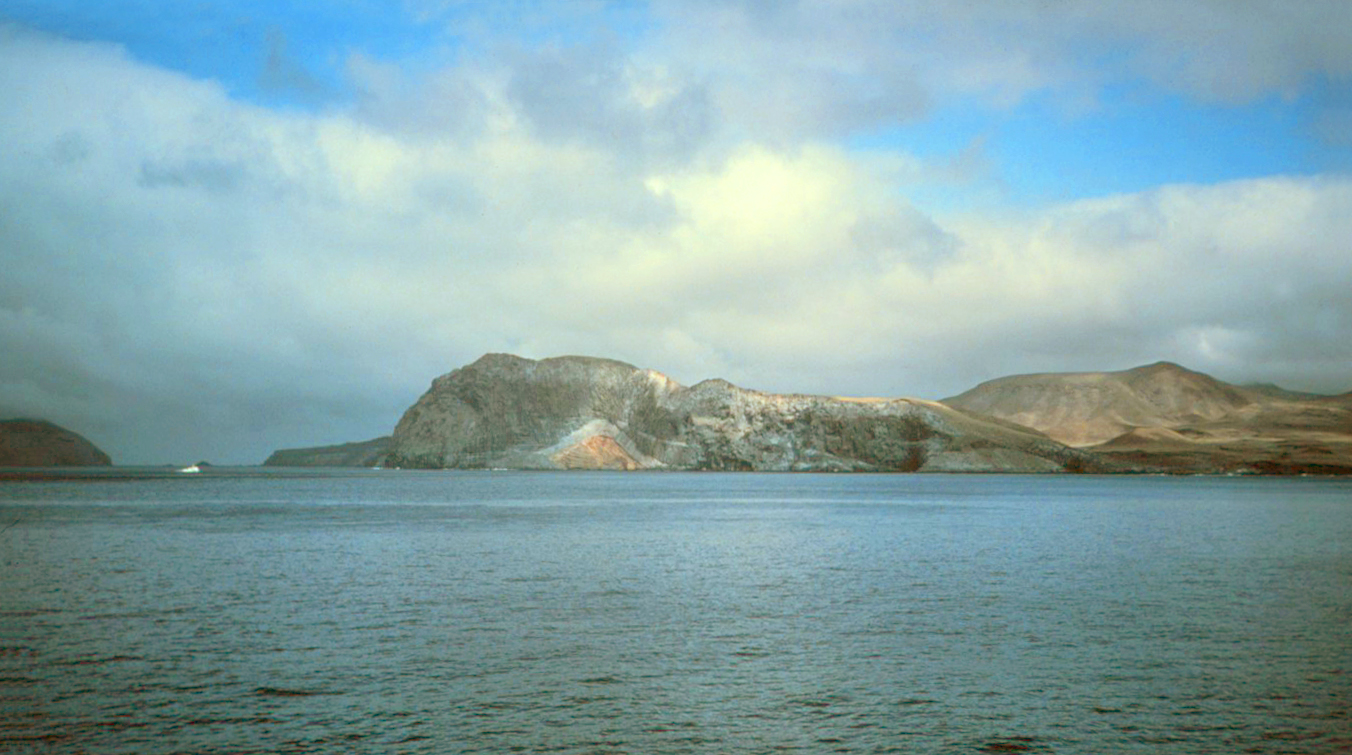
- Southeastern coast of Guadalupe Island

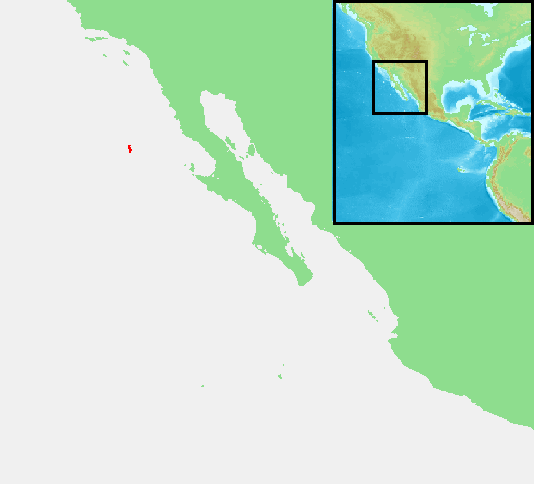
- Map of Guadalupe Island, Mexico

Geography
- Location: Pacific Ocean
- Coordinates: 29°1′51″N 118°16′48″W
- Area: 243.988 km^{2} (94.204 sq mi)
- Highest elevation: 1,297.5 m (4256.9 ft)
- Highest point: Mount Augusta

Administration
- Mexico
- State: Baja California
- Municipality: Ensenada
- Delegación: Ensenada

Demographics
- Population: 213 (2010)

Additional information
- Official language: Spanish

Guadalupe Island (Spanish: Isla Guadalupe) is a volcanic island located 241 kilometres (130 nautical miles; 150 miles) off the western coast of Mexico's Baja California peninsula and about 400 km (220 nmi; 250 mi) southwest of the city of Ensenada in the state of Baja California, in the Pacific Ocean. The various volcanoes are extinct or dormant. In 2005 Guadalupe Island and its surrounding waters and islets were declared a biosphere reserve to restore its vegetation (decimated by feral goats) and to protect its population of marine mammals and birds. The island was a popular destination for great white shark cage diving before a tourism ban was put in place in 2022. Guadalupe Island is inhabited only by scientists, military personnel operating a weather station, and a small group of seasonal fishermen. The island is mostly arid and has very little surface water.

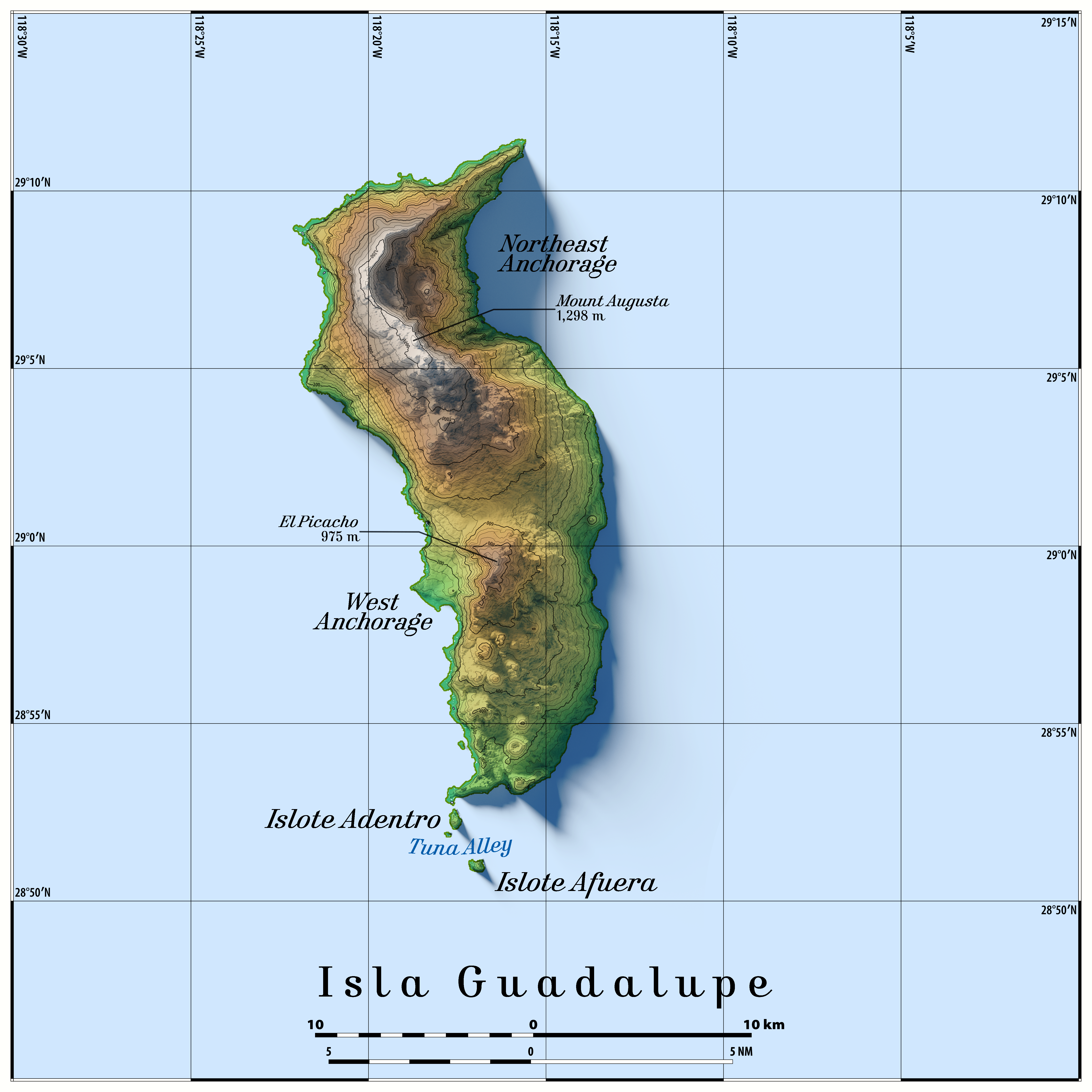
Topographic map of Guadalupe Island

The two other Mexican island groups in the Pacific Ocean that are not on the continental shelf are the Revillagigedo Islands and Rocas Alijos. Guadalupe Island and its islets are the westernmost region of Mexico.

== Discovery and history ==
The first known sighting of Guadalupe Island was in 1602 when a Spanish expedition headed by Sebastián Vizcaíno sailed by but did not land on the island. In the late 18th and 19th centuries the island was frequently visited by fur seal, otter, and elephant seal hunters. Goats were probably introduced by seal hunters in the early 1800s and quickly increased their numbers, nearly eradicating the indigenous vegetation.

== Administration and population ==
The 2010 census recorded a population of 213 people on the island. In 2015, it was estimated to have fewer than 150 permanent residents. Guadalupe is part of Ensenada delegación, one of the 24 delegaciones or subdivisions of Ensenada Municipality of the Mexican state of Baja California. Ensenada delegación and Chapultepec delegación together form the city of Ensenada, the municipal seat of the namesake municipality. The postal code of Guadalupe Island is 22997.

Campo Oeste ("West Camp", also called Campo Tepeyac, with 15 buildings) is a small community of abalone and lobster fishermen, located on the western coast, specifically on the north side of West Anchorage, a bay that provides protection from the strong winds and swells that whip the islands during winter. Generators provide electricity, and a military vessel brings 30,000 litres (7,900 US gal) of freshwater. The number of fishermen varies annually depending on the fishing season. Ten months of the year the 30 families of the fishing cooperative "Abuloneros and Langosteros of Guadalupe Island" are present.

Additional temporary fishing camps are Campo Norte ("North Camp", four buildings), Campo Lima (Campo Corrals) (one building) and Arroyitos (four buildings).

At the southern tip, on Melpómene Cove, there is a weather station staffed by a detachment from the Mexican Ministry of the Navy. The site is called Campamento Sur ("South Encampment").

Campo Bosque was established as a temporary camp in 1999 in the cypress forest in the north. The camp houses members of the Cooperative Farming Society "Francisco Javier Maytorena, S.C. of R.L." and removes goats from the island and sells them in the State of Sonora, with permission of Secretariat of the Environment and Natural Resources (SEMARNAT) and the support of the Secretariat of the Navy.

Campo Pista is located at the small airport, near the center of the island (29°01′24.04″N 118°16′21.75″W, elevation: 592 m, direction: 05/23). Airport Isla Guadalupe (ICAO Code MMGD) has a 1,200-metre-long (3,900 ft) runway. At the end of the runway near threshold 5 is the wreckage of a Lockheed Model 18 Lodestar, which overshot the runway during landing. A North American B-25J-30/32 Mitchell, BMM-3501 (c/n 44-86712), bomber wrecked on the opposite end of the runway, after suffering serious damage in trying to take-off overloaded (29°01′36.10″N 118°16′2.98″W). The B-25 wreckage was removed between October 2005 and June 2006.

Because Guadalupe Island is located within a biosphere reserve, anyone visiting the island must obtain a permit from the Mexican government; this means the communities on the island are closed towns.

== Geology ==
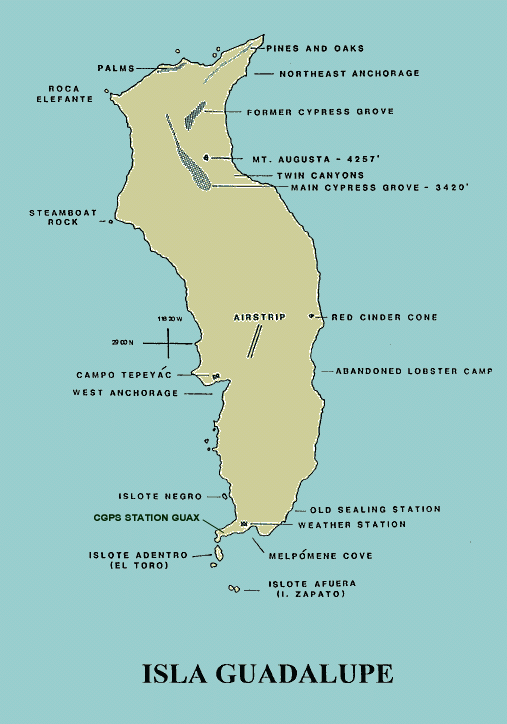
Island map

Guadalupe Island has a rugged landscape composed of two shield volcanoes which formed on a now extinct mid-ocean ridge. They are overlain by lava flows and cinder cones that were emplaced along northwest-southeast and northeast-southwest trending fissure vents. The youngest shield volcano comprises the northern end of the island and may have formed during the Holocene epoch. A series of very fresh-looking alkali basalt flows along with trachyte domes in the northern shield volcano caldera represent the most recently formed rocks on Guadalupe Island.

== Geography ==
The island measures 35 kilometres (22 mi) north-south and up to 9.5 kilometres (6 mi) east-west, with a total area of 243.988 km^{2} (94 13/64 sq mi). It features a chain of high volcanic mountain ridges which rises to a height of 1,298 metres (4,259 ft) at its northern end (Mount Augusta). Its smaller counterpart on the southern end is the 975 metres (3,199 ft) El Picacho. The southern part of the island is mostly barren, but there are scattered stands of trees at higher elevations of the northern part of the island and in the Twin Canyon area on the northeast coast. The coast generally consists of rocky bluffs with detached rocks fronting some of them. Two high and prominent islets are within three kilometres (1.9 mi) of the southwestern end of the island, separated from one another by a gap called Tuna Alley:

- Islote Afuera (Outer Islet, also Islote Zapato), 28°51′53″N 118°17′41″W, 1.5 ha (4 acres), the most distant, steep with almost vertical walls above and below water
- Islote Adentro (Inner Islet, also El Toro), 28°52′18″N 118°17′34″W, 0.393 km^{2} (97 acres), with two smaller islets nearby:
  - Church Rock
  - Roca del Skip

Elsewhere, the other islets are very small and close to the shore, all less than one kilometre (1/2 nmi) away:

- Islote Negro, 28°54′23″N 118°17′18″W, 8.8 ha (21 3/4 acres), to the southwest
- Roca Hundida, 28°55′00″N 118°18′00″W, 0.3 ha (3/4 acre), to the southwest
- Islote Bernal, 28°56′04″N 118°17′53″W, 1.1 ha (2 3/4 acres), to the southwest
- Palto Muerto, 28°56′49″N 118°17′42″W, 0.5 ha (1 1/4 acres), 2 km (1 nmi) north of Islote Bernal
- unnamed islet, 28°56′59″N 118°17′48″W, 0.2 ha (1/2 acre), 4 km (2 nmi) north of Islote Bernal
- Steamboat Rock, 0.3 ha (3/4 acre), to the west
- Roca Elefante, 0.1 ha (1/4 acre), to the northwest (the westernmost)
  - Roca Elefante is the westernmost point in both Mexico and Latin America.

=== Climate ===
The island has two major climate zones: a very arid, warm climate between 0 and 800 metres (0 and 2,625 feet) elevation, with mean monthly temperature between 15.5 and 20.3 °C (59.9 and 68.5 °F) and an arid, temperate climate above 800 metres (2,600 ft) elevation.

Most precipitation occurs over the winter months with a strong influence of northwestern winds and cyclones.

Rainfall averages 133 millimetres (5.2 in) near sea level at the south end, but appears to be much more at the high north end. An estimate for the rainfall in the northern highlands is possible by way of taking Pinus radiata as an indicator, which is native to that area of the island. In other places where Pinus radiata is native, it grows best with about 750 millimetres (30 in) of rainfall but under some conditions can survive with as little as half that much. The effective moisture is much greater because of fog drip.

Climate data for Guadalupe Island 1951–1980
Month	Jan	Feb	Mar	Apr	May	Jun	Jul	Aug	Sep	Oct	Nov	Dec	Year
Record high °C (°F)	27.8 (82.0)	30.0 (86.0)	30.0 (86.0)	28.4 (83.1)	29.5 (85.1)	31.3 (88.3)	31.7 (89.1)	35.0 (95.0)	32.2 (90.0)	32.2 (90.0)	30.6 (87.1)	28.8 (83.8)	35.0 (95.0)
Mean daily maximum °C (°F)	18.9 (66.0)	19.6 (67.3)	19.8 (67.6)	20.1 (68.2)	20.8 (69.4)	21.8 (71.2)	23.0 (73.4)	23.9 (75.0)	24.2 (75.6)	23.2 (73.8)	21.6 (70.9)	20.1 (68.2)	21.4 (70.5)
Daily mean °C (°F)	15.5 (59.9)	15.6 (60.1)	15.6 (60.1)	16.1 (61.0)	16.7 (62.1)	17.6 (63.7)	19.0 (66.2)	20.1 (68.2)	20.3 (68.5)	19.4 (66.9)	17.9 (64.2)	16.3 (61.3)	17.5 (63.5)
Mean daily minimum °C (°F)	11.8 (53.2)	11.6 (52.9)	11.6 (52.9)	12.0 (53.6)	12.4 (54.3)	13.1 (55.6)	14.5 (58.1)	15.9 (60.6)	16.4 (61.5)	15.5 (59.9)	13.8 (56.8)	12.5 (54.5)	13.4 (56.1)
Record low °C (°F)	3.5 (38.3)	3.4 (38.1)	2.2 (36.0)	1.0 (33.8)	6.2 (43.2)	7.6 (45.7)	8.0 (46.4)	8.8 (47.8)	5.4 (41.7)	6.2 (43.2)	4.5 (40.1)	0.9 (33.6)	0.9 (33.6)
Average precipitation mm (inches)	16.3 (0.64)	21.6 (0.85)	18.0 (0.71)	9.5 (0.37)	1.1 (0.04)	1.2 (0.05)	0.4 (0.02)	0.2 (0.01)	0.6 (0.02)	5.1 (0.20)	12.3 (0.48)	22.2 (0.87)	108.5 (4.27)
Average precipitation days (≥ 0.1 mm)	2.16	2.00	2.55	1.10	0.37	0.14	0.12	0.07	0.17	0.82	1.89	2.32	13.71
Average relative humidity (%)	79	79	78	78	79	82	83	81	81	80	79	79	80
Source: Colegio de Postgraduados

== Ecology ==
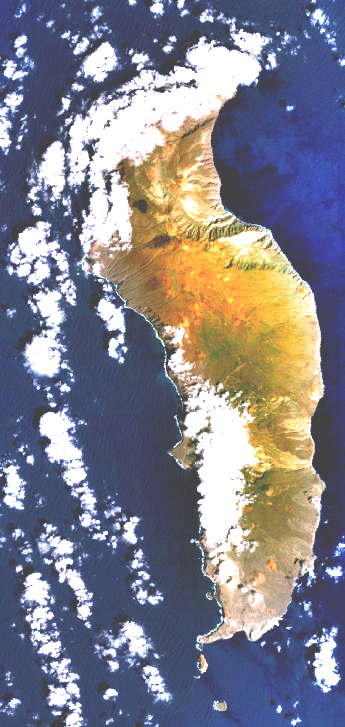
NASA satellite image

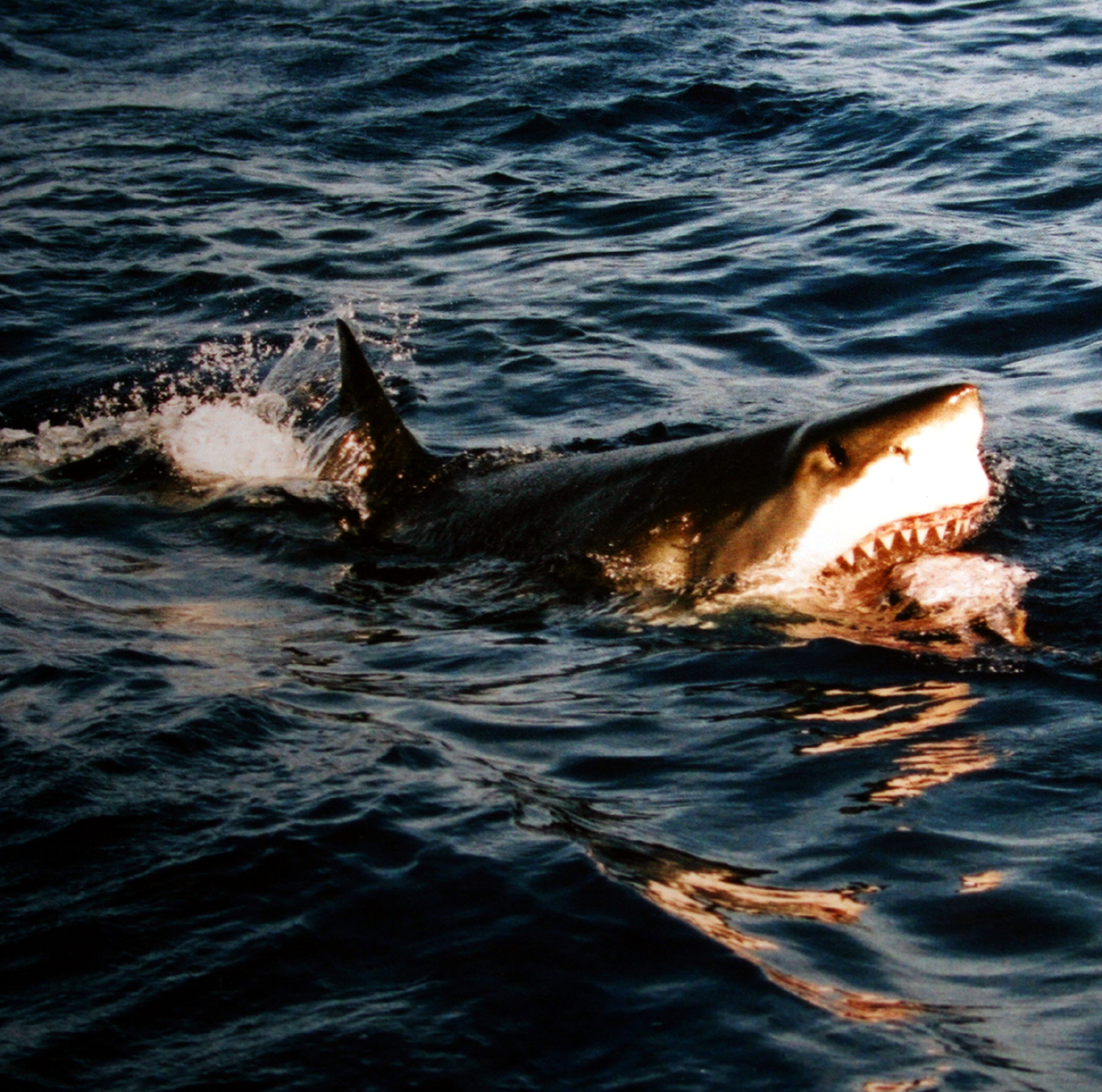
Great white shark off Isla Guadalupe

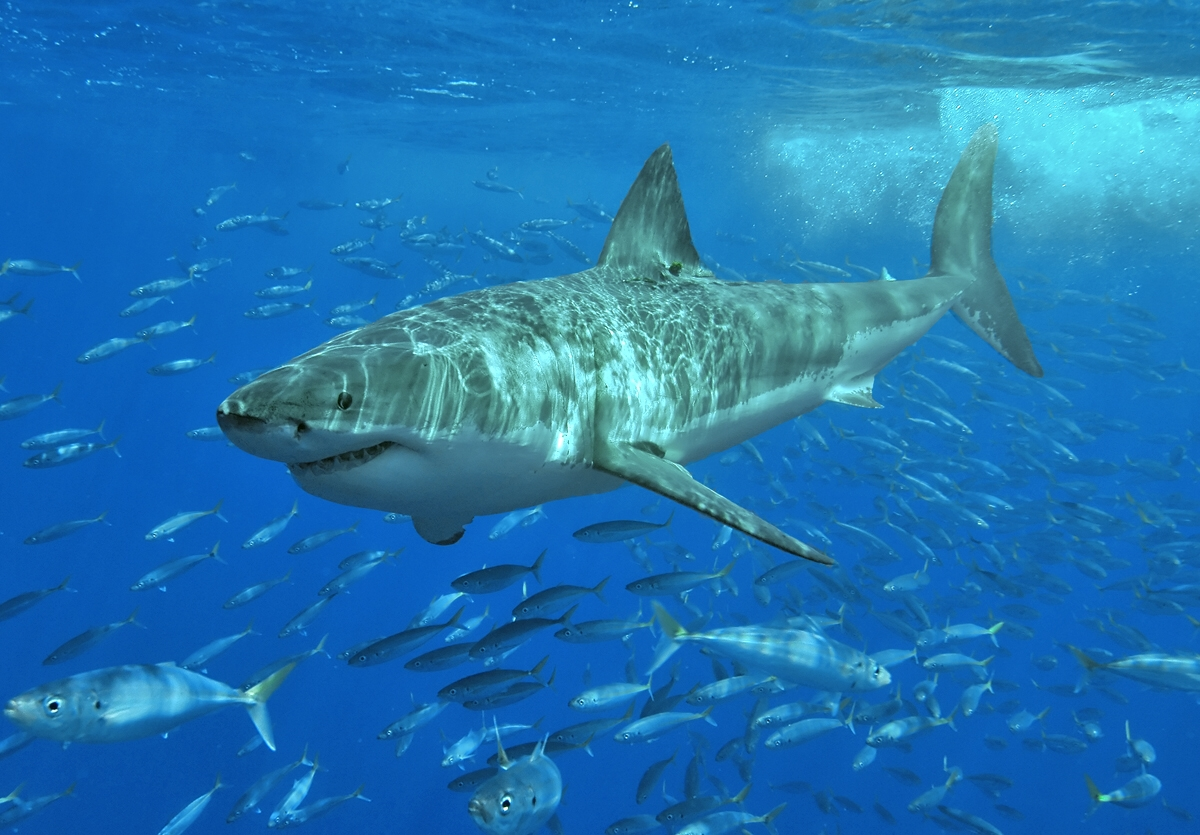
Great white shark off Isla Guadalupe

Guadalupe Island was a major destination for Russian and American fur hunters seeking the Guadalupe fur seal (Arctocephalus townsendi) in the 18th and 19th centuries. Captain Auguste Duhaut-Cilly reported in 1827 that a Sandwich Islands (Hawaiian Islands) brig "had spent several months there and collected three thousand sealskins". The northern elephant seal (Mirounga angustirostris) was also ruthlessly hunted for the oil in its blubber.

Northern elephant seals were thought to be extinct by 1884 until a remnant population of eight individuals was discovered on Guadalupe Island in 1892 by a Smithsonian expedition, which promptly killed several of them for their collections. The northern elephant seals managed to survive, and were finally protected by the Mexican government in 1922.

Guadalupe shares the California chaparral and woodlands ecoregion with the Channel Islands of California in the United States, but the island was at one time practically denuded of all plants higher than a few centimeters by up to 100,000 (Note: The maximum population that was reached in the late 19th century; nearly two feral goats per acre and more than four per hectare: León de la Luz et al (2003)) feral goats.

Originally brought to the island in the 19th century by European whalers and sealers for provisions when stopping over, the population eventually eliminated most vegetation; the number of feral goats declined to a few thousand. Before this collapse, the main impact of the feral goat population was about the turn of the 19th/20th century. Naturalist A. W. Anthony wrote in 1901:

"It is directly due to the despised Billy-goat that many interesting species of plants formerly abundant are now extinct, and also that one or more of the birds peculiar to the island has disappeared, and others are following rapidly."

After the crash, the feral goat population once again grew, this time more slowly, until it had reached the new, lower carrying capacity at maybe 10,000–20,000 in modern times. The island had been a nature conservancy area since August 16, 1928, making it one of the oldest reserves in Mexico. Extirpation of the feral goats was long envisioned, but logistical difficulties, such as island size and lack of suitable spots for landing and encamping hunters and material, prevented this. In 2002, the Mexican government (including SEMARNAT) and the conservation group Grupo de Ecología y Conservación de Islas began extirpating the feral goats. In June 2005, after many years of false starts, the Mexican government had almost completed a round-up and evacuation of the remaining feral goat population. In 2007, the feral goat extirpation program ended (10,000 feral goats were killed). Guadalupe Island was designated a biosphere reserve on April 25, 2005.

French sea captain Auguste Duhaut-Cilly remarked on the tall trees on the north of Guadalupe Island as he sailed past on January 2, 1827. Of the four large tree species on Guadalupe Island (the Guadalupe palm, Guadalupe cypress, island oak, and Monterey pine), there were only old individuals left; the California juniper population had entirely disappeared. As the feral goats ate any seedlings that managed to germinate, no regeneration of trees was possible. Water, formerly plentiful as the common fogs condensed in the forests of the northern end of the island, today only occurs in a few scattered pools and springs. Because the springs were a critical emergency water supply for the human inhabitants, protective measures including feral goat fences were installed beginning in 2000, allowing new seedlings of many species to survive for the first time in 150 years. Seacology, a non-profit environmental group located in Berkeley, CA, provided funding to the Island Conservation & Ecology Group for the construction of 10 fenced exclosures to keep feral goats out of the most sensitive areas of Guadalupe Island.

In November 1850, U.S. Army Lt. George H. Derby passed the island on his expedition in the U.S. Transport Invincible. He described it thus: "This island is about 15 miles length and 5 in width. It is rocky + mountainous but capped with vegetation and is reputed to be thickly inhabited by wild goats of unusual size. Water is found upon the eastern shore and the Island is frequently visited by small vessels engaged in the capture of the sea elephant numbers of which animals are found upon its coast."

Many islands or marine species that reside on or near Guadalupe also frequent the Channel Islands, and vice versa. In stark contrast to the rampant extinction of terrestrial life that happened at the same time, Guadalupe was the last refuge for the northern elephant seal (Mirounga angustirostris) and the Guadalupe fur seal (Arctocephalus townsendi) in the 1890s. The island has been a pinniped sanctuary since 1975.

The movement of the cool, nutrient-rich water current promotes phytoplankton production and attracts both coastal and deep-water species, including spanish mackerel, yellowfin tuna and great white sharks.

Guadalupe is considered one of the best spots in the world for sightings of the great white shark (Carcharhodon carcharias), because of its clear water and large population of pinnipeds, their primary prey. Because of the aggregation of over 350 identified white sharks, the island has hosted a recreational cage diving industry from one boat in 2005, to as many as eight operators in 2019, bringing thousands of shark enthusiasts to the island. In 2019 the Mexican Department SEMARNANT suspended cage diving and sport fishing between May and December to evaluate tourism’s impact on the several hundred protected white sharks congregating there. The Mexican Government said the closure was intended to gather information to adopt the best sustainability practices that guarantee their conservation. As of January 10, 2023, cage diving with great white sharks at Isla Guadalupe, Mexico, is permanently prohibited. The Mexican Government’s ban covers all tourism inside the reserve, including film production and liveaboard diving.

The island has been recognised as an Important Bird Area (IBA) by BirdLife International.

=== Habitat types ===
Before the extirpation of the feral goats, surveys found eight major land habitats on Guadalupe:

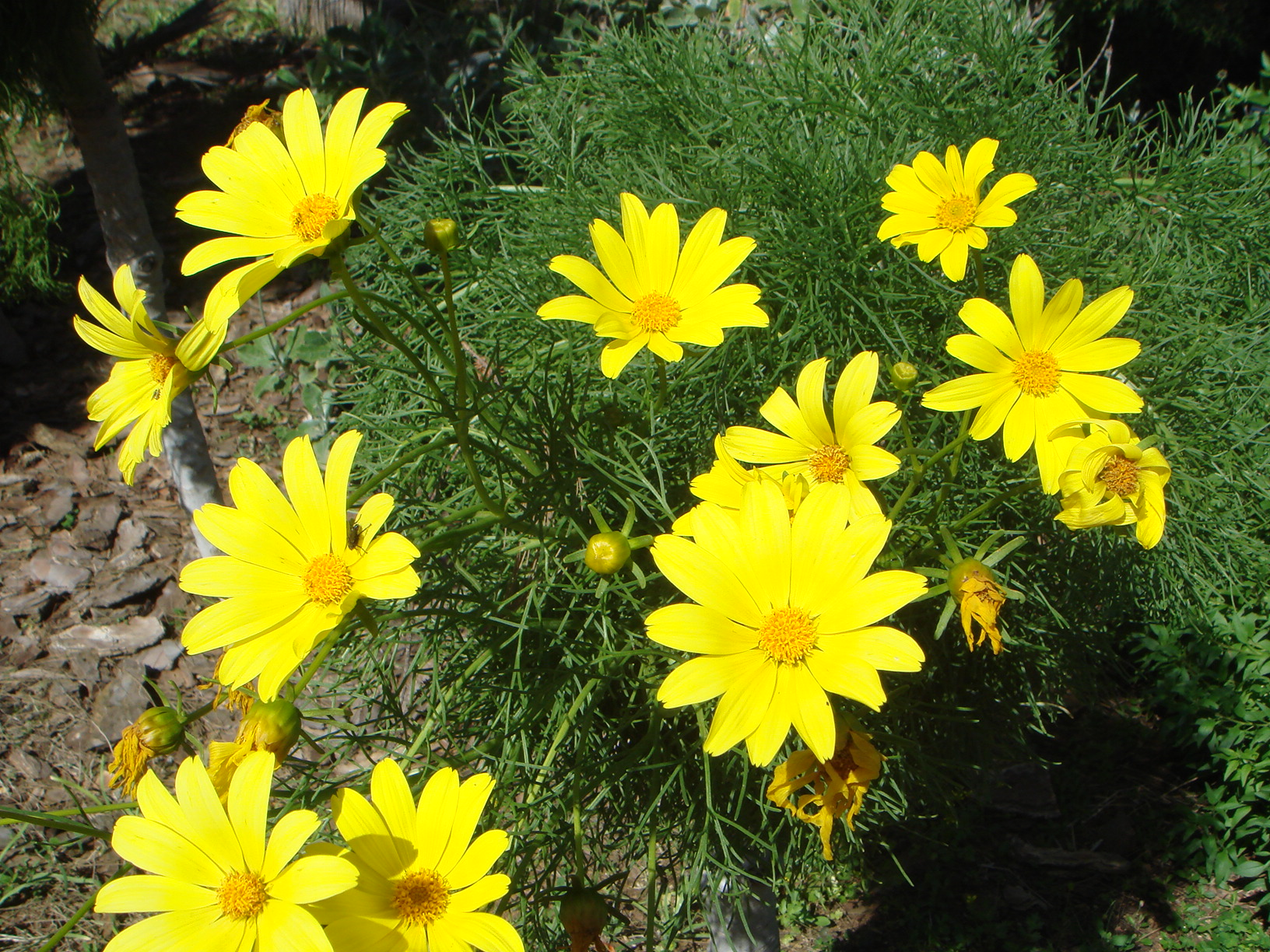
Giant coreopsis (Coreopsis gigantea)

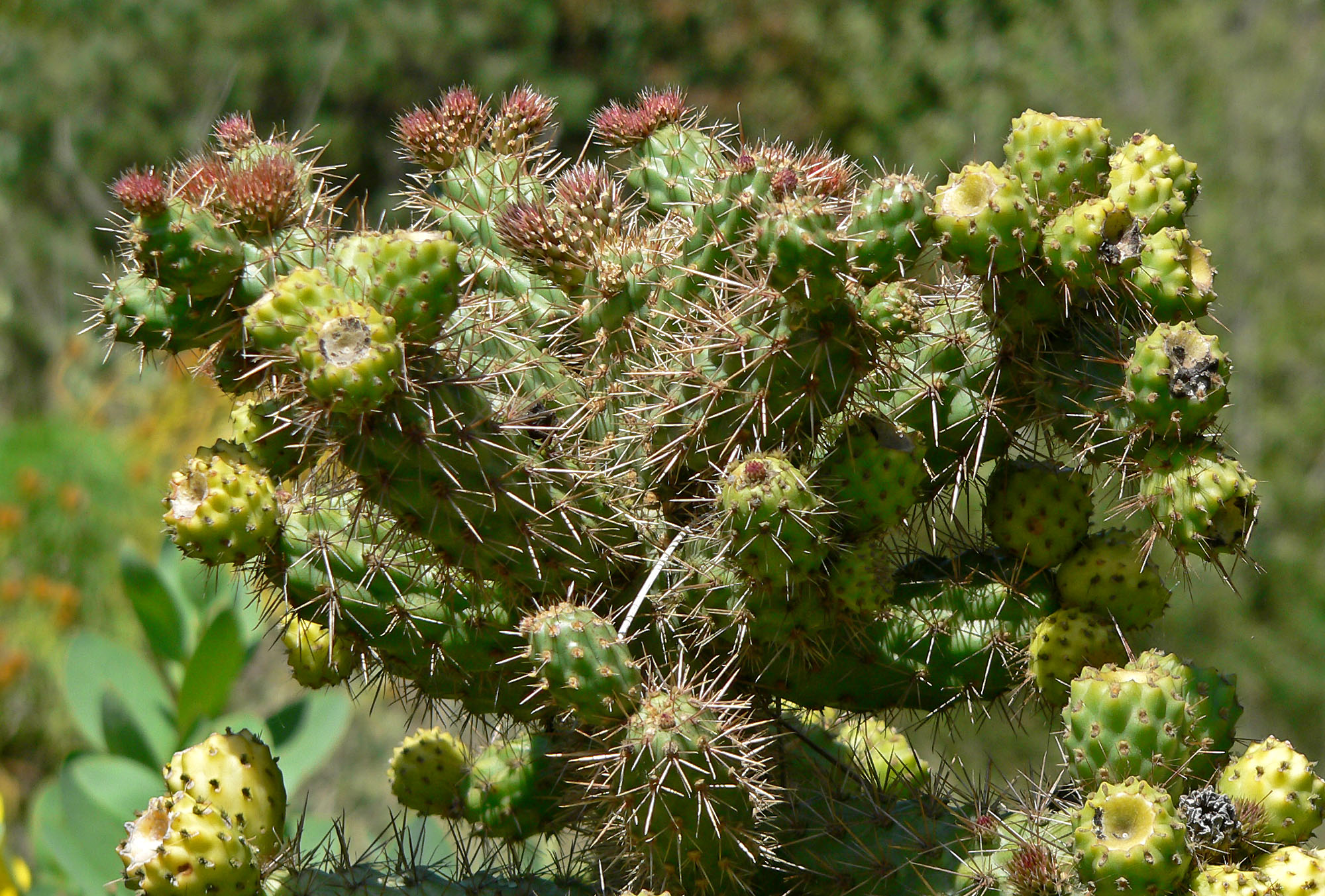
Cylindropuntia prolifera

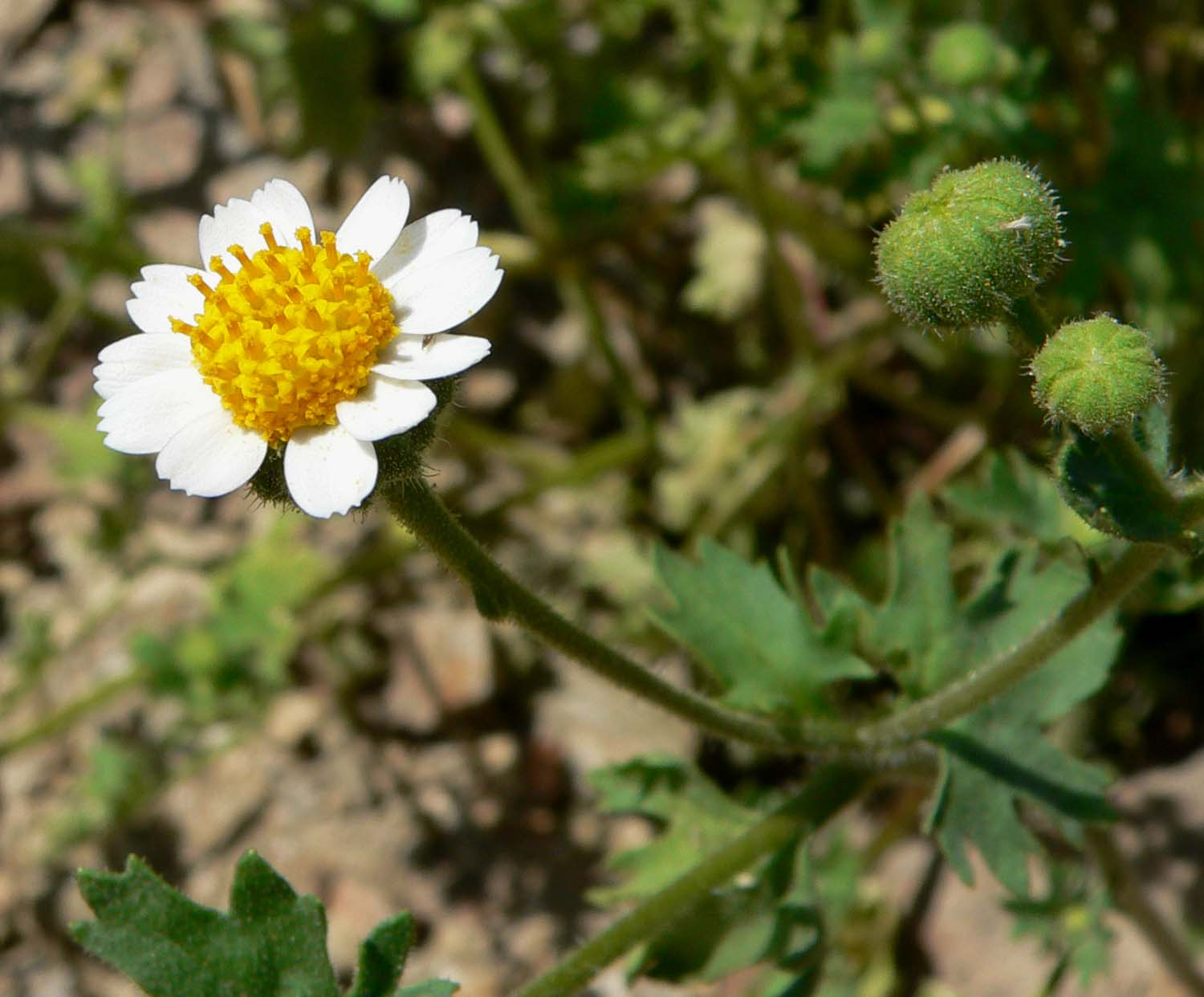
Perityle emoryi

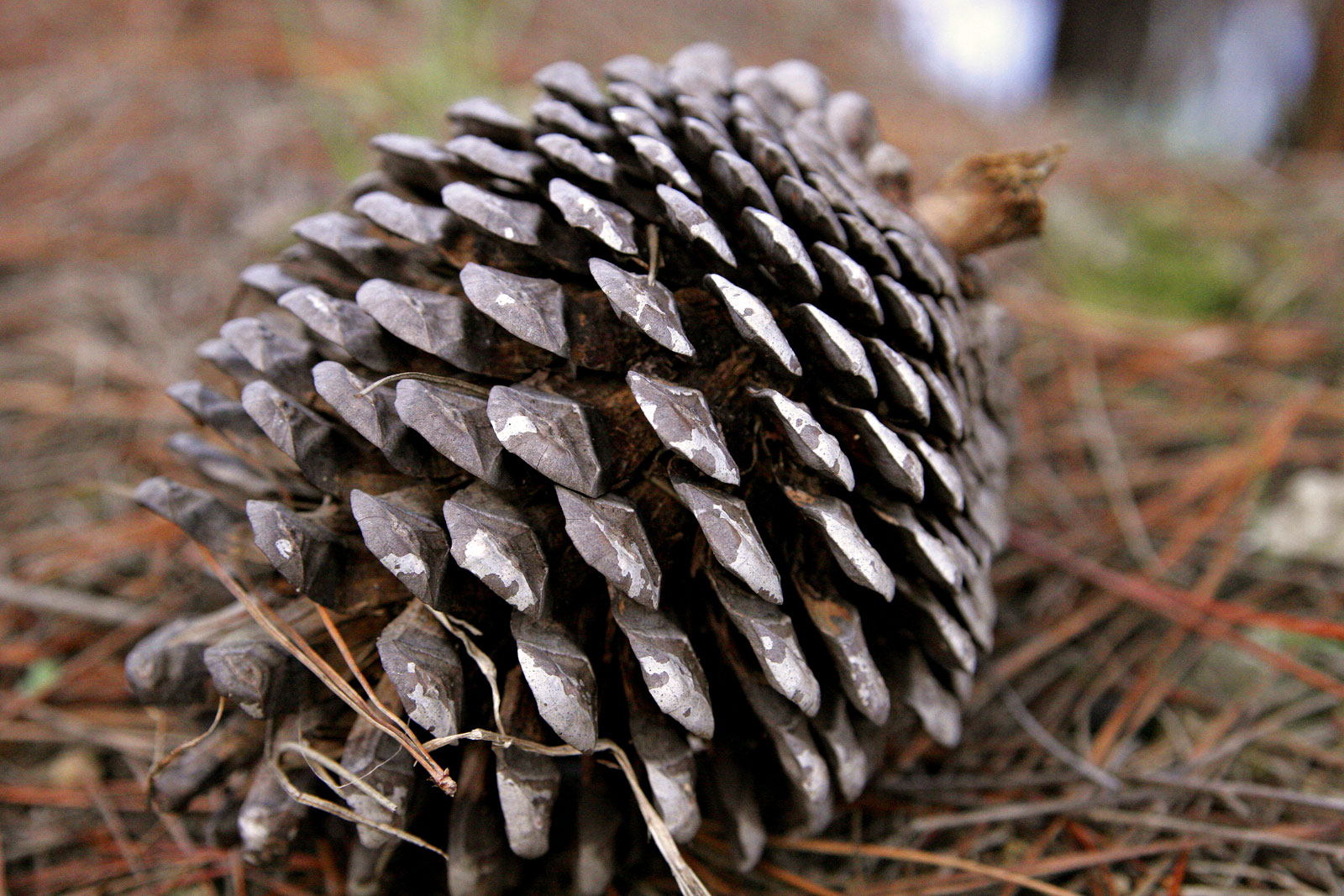
Pinus radiata cone

1. Flora of the coastal lowlands and rocky cliffs: mainly up to 200 metres (660 ft) above mean sea level (ASL), but higher on the steep cliffs. Largely unresearched due to difficult access, the cliffs might even harbor remnant specimens of the presumably extinct plants.
2. Succulent perennial herbs: 200–400 metres (660–1,310 ft) ASL, chiefly on the southern end and on the offshore islets, and in less steep areas towards sea level. Here, the highest number of endemic plants exist. Baeriopsis guadalupensis, Cistanthe guadalupensis, Dudleya guadalupensis, Hemizonia greeneana ssp. greeneana, H. palmeri, Nesothamnus incanus, and Stephanomeria guadalupensis are dominant endemics, and giant coreopsis (Coreopsis gigantea), a non-endemic native species, is also abundant.
3. Arid maritime shrubland: 400–600 metres (1,300–2,000 ft) ASL. Mainly in the southern portion around El Picacho. Native species occurring here include Ambrosia camphorata, Atriplex barclayana, Cylindropuntia prolifera and California boxthorn (Lycium californicum); none of these is endemic.
4. Herbland dominated by introduced plants: 600–800 metres (2,000–2,600 ft) ASL, mainly on the central plateau. This habitat is almost entirely a consequence of overgrazing; hardly anything of the original ecosystem remains. Dominant introduced plants are Avena barbata, Bromus berteroanus, great brome (B. diandrus), soft brome (B. hordeaceus sspp. hordaceus and mollis), red brome (B. madritensis ssp. rubens), tocalote (Centaurea melitensis), nettle-leaved goosefoot (Chenopodium murale), Filago californica, wall barley (Hordeum murinum sspp. glaucum and leporinum), crystalline iceplant (Mesembryanthemum crystallinum), M. nodiflorum, Polypogon monspeliensis and Sisymbrium orientale. The non-endemic natives dwarf coastweed (Amblyopappus pusillus), island false bindweed (Calystegia macrostegia ssp. macrostegia), Cryptantha maritima var. maritima, Filago arizonica, Gilia nevinii, California goldfields (Lasthenia californica), Pectocarya palmeri and Perityle emoryi as well as the endemics Cryptantha foliosa and Sphaeralcea palmeri can be found here also; some are still numerous. This probably was a mesic shrub/herbland before the goats destroyed the upland forest, upsetting the water supply. Native plants still found on Guadalupe, like Crossosoma californicum, laurel sumac (Malosma laurina) and the endemic Camissonia guadalupensis ssp. guadalupensis, presumably thrived here in former times, as would have such taxa as the native hoary-leaved ceanothus (Ceanothus crassifolius), wedge-leaved ceanothus (C. cuneatus) – and possibly also felt-leaved ceanothus (C. arboreus), which was found in 2001–2003 surveys –, Cammisonia robusta, red-flowering currant (Ribes sanguineum) and the endemic Hesperelaea palmeri, which have now disappeared from the island.
5. Guadalupe palm groves: 400–900 metres (1,300–3,000 ft) ASL on the northwest side of the island. There are hundreds of palm trees remaining, mainly in a single patch of this habitat. At least one other major palm forest existed at the western coast; it was still present in 1906 at "Steamer Point". As reproduction is presumably still ongoing, the species will likely recover in due time.
6. Guadalupe cypress forest: 800–1,000 metres (2,600–3,300 ft) ASL. Presently some 4,000 old trees, essentially limited to the central-northern part. Other cypress forests, such as a major stand NE of the present patch which was still extant in 1906, were destroyed by the goats early in the 20th century. There is still reproduction, but the water table appears to have declined to below the level required by the cypresses, and mortality of the old trees is high and can be expected to continue even after the removal of the goats.
7. Guadalupe palm – island oak – Monterey pine woodland: 900–1,000 metres (3,000–3,300 ft) ASL. This habitat has all but disappeared during the 20th century, due to the decline in numbers of the oaks and pines.
8. Guadalupe pine cloud forest with some island oak: restricted to above 1,000 metres (3,300 ft) ASL on the N-NE point of the island. The population of the pine has declined by about two-thirds during the last 35 years; it presently stands at about 130 old trees in the main population and about the same number scattered elsewhere. Reproduction is ongoing, with several hundred seedlings having successfully established themselves since 2000, and with the elimination of goat browsing, the pines will likely make a full recovery. The situation of the oak is direr; there are only 20 trees or so remaining (by about 1950, there were 100) and they appear past reproductive age. Not being restricted to Guadalupe, seedlings could be imported from elsewhere.

A ninth habitat type, California juniper woodland and extending on the central plateau below the cypress forest, was entirely gone by 1906. What other endemic lifeforms underwent coextinction with it will forever remain unknown.

=== Endemism ===
Animals:

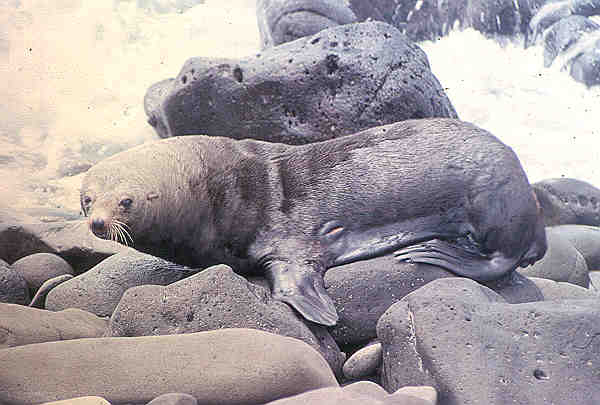
Guadalupe fur seal (Arctocephalus townsendi)

- Guadalupe fur seal (Arctocephalus townsendi) – only major breeding site
- Townsend's storm petrel (Hydrobates socorroensis) – only known breeding site

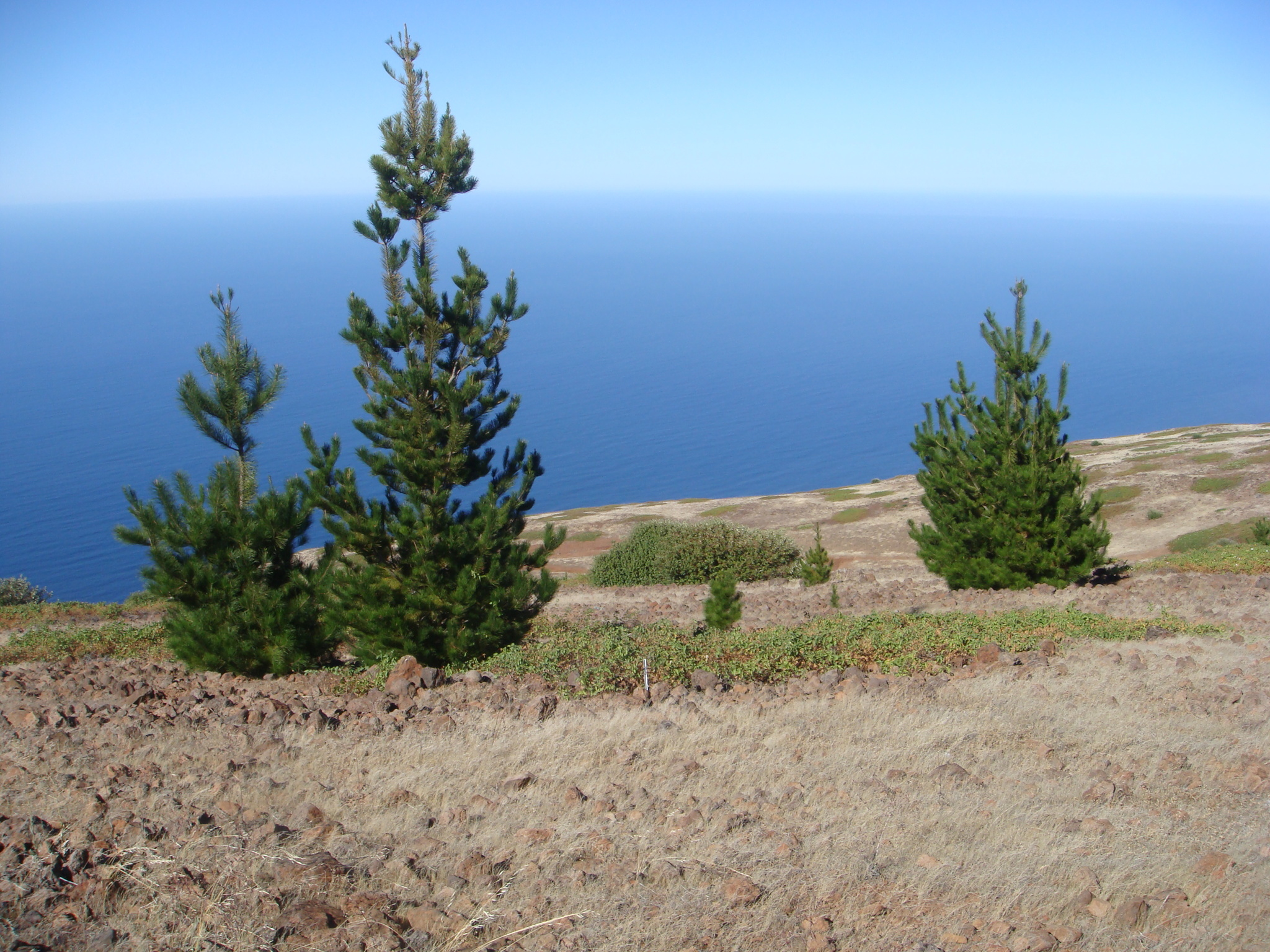
The Guadalupe Monterey pine, almost extinct due to grazing by feral goats

- Ainley's storm petrel (Hydrobates cheimomnestes) – only known breeding site
- Guadalupe rock wren (Salpinctes obsoletus guadalupensis) – endemic
- Guadalupe house finch (Haemorhous mexicanus amplus) – endemic
- Guadalupe pipefish (Syngnathus insulae) – endemic
- Guadalupe junco (Junco insularis) – endemic
- Guadalupe caracara (Caracara lutosa) – endemic, extinct
- Guadalupe ameiva (Pholidoscelis cineraceus) - endemic, extinct
- Guadalupe Bewick's wren (Thryomanes bewickii brevicauda) – endemic, possibly extinct
- Endemic spiders:
  - Habronattus gigas
  - Herpyllus giganteus
  - Kibramoa isolata
  - Sergiolus guadalupensis

Plants:

- Baeriopsis guadalupensis – near-endemic
- Brahea edulis (Guadalupe palm) – effectively endemic (Note: Some naturalized populations exist in California)
- Camissonia guadalupensis ssp. guadalupensis – endemic
- Castilleja fruticosa – endemic
- Cistanthe guadalupensis – endemic
- Hesperocyparis guadalupensis (Guadalupe cypress) – endemic
- Cryptantha foliosa – endemic
- Deinandra frutescens – endemic
- Deinandra greeneana ssp. greeneana – endemic
- Deinandra palmeri – endemic
- Dudleya guadalupensis – endemic
- Dudleya virens ssp. extima – endemic
- Eriogonum zapatoense – endemic
- Erysimum moranii – endemic
- Eschscholzia elegans – near-endemic
- Eschscholzia palmeri – endemic
- Galium angulosum – endemic
- Githopsis diffusa var. guadalupensis – endemic
- Hemizonia frutescens – endemic
- Hemizonia greeneana ssp. greeneana – endemic
- Hemizonia palmeri – endemic
- Heteromeles arbutifolia var. macrocarpa – probably endemic
- Lavatera lindsayi – endemic
- Lupinus niveus – endemic
- Marah guadalupensis – near-endemic or endemic (Note: Depending on whether this population belongs to Marah macrocarpus var. major or not)
- Perityle incana – endemic
- Phacelia phyllomanica – endemic
- Pinus radiata var. binata (Guadalupe Monterey pine) – near-endemic or endemic (Note: Depending on the taxonomic status of the Cedros Island population)
- Satureja palmeri – endemic; rediscovered in 2001–2003 surveys
- Senecio palmeri – endemic
- Sphaeralcea palmeri – endemic
- Sphaeralcea sulphurea – endemic
- Stephanomeria guadalupensis – endemic
- Triteleia guadalupensis – endemic

=== Extinctions ===
Numerous taxa have gone extinct due to the habitat destruction by the feral goats, which in turn rendered the endemic fauna vulnerable to predation by introduced feral cats and adverse weather by depriving them of shelter.

There have been 5–6 extinctions of birds:

- Guadalupe Bewick's wren (Thryomanes bewickii brevicauda), the late 1890s
- Guadalupe spotted towhee (Pipilo maculatus consobrinus), the late 1890s
- Guadalupe caracara (Caracara lutosa), 1906 – intentionally made extinct by humans, ironically because it occasionally preyed on young goats
- Guadalupe red-shafted flicker (Colaptes auratus rufipileus), 1906 – the island was later recolonized by individuals of an extant mainland red-shafted northern flicker subspecies (which one is unknown)
- Guadalupe storm petrel (Hydrobates macrodactyla), the 1910s
- Guadalupe ruby-crowned kinglet (Corthylio calendula obscurus) – close to extinction (if, indeed, it still exists); it was not observed in 2000, despite thorough searches

Globally extinct plant taxa from Guadalupe Island are:

- Castilleja guadalupensis
- Hesperelaea palmeri
- Pogogyne tenuiflora

and one species of plant incertae sedis

== Notes ==
Its time zone is Pacific Standard Time
