= Xanthophyllum adenotus var. arsatii =

Scientific classification
- Kingdom: Plantae
- Clade: Tracheophytes
- Clade: Angiosperms
- Clade: Eudicots
- Clade: Rosids
- Order: Fabales
- Family: Polygalaceae
- Genus: Xanthophyllum
- Species: X. adenotus
- Variety: X. a. var. arsatii

Trinomial name
- Xanthophyllum adenotus var. arsatii (C.E.C.Fisch.) W.J.de Wilde & Duyfjes

Synonyms
- Xanthophyllum arsatii C.E.C.Fisch.

Variety of shrub

Xanthophyllum adenotus var. arsatii is a plant in the family Polygalaceae. It grows as a tree or shrub.

== Distribution and habitat ==
Xanthophyllum adenotus var. arsatii is endemic to Borneo. Its habitat is mixed dipterocarp forests from sea-level to 400 metres (1,300 ft) altitude.
