= Xanthophyllum tenue =

Scientific classification
- Kingdom: Plantae
- Clade: Tracheophytes
- Clade: Angiosperms
- Clade: Eudicots
- Clade: Rosids
- Order: Fabales
- Family: Polygalaceae
- Genus: Xanthophyllum
- Species: X. tenue

Binomial name
- Xanthophyllum tenue Chodat

Species of tree

Xanthophyllum tenue is a tree in the family Polygalaceae. The specific epithet tenue is from the Latin meaning 'slender', referring to the twigs.

== Description ==
Xanthophyllum tenue grows up to 25 metres (80 ft) tall with a trunk diameter of up to 40 centimetres (16 in). The smooth bark is greyish or pale brown. The flowers are yellowish or white, drying orange. The round fruits are pale greenish brown and measure up to 1.9 cm (1 in) in diameter.

== Distribution and habitat ==
Xanthophyllum tenue is endemic to Borneo. Its habitat is mixed dipterocarp and lower montane forests from sea-level to 1,500 metres (5,000 ft) altitude.
