= Xanthophyllum reticulatum =

Scientific classification
- Kingdom: Plantae
- Clade: Tracheophytes
- Clade: Angiosperms
- Clade: Eudicots
- Clade: Rosids
- Order: Fabales
- Family: Polygalaceae
- Genus: Xanthophyllum
- Species: X. reticulatum

Binomial name
- Xanthophyllum reticulatum Chodat

Species of flowering plant

Xanthophyllum reticulatum is a plant in the family Polygalaceae. The specific epithet reticulatum is from the Latin meaning 'netted', referring to the leaf veins.

== Description ==
Xanthophyllum reticulatum grows as a shrub or tree up to 15 metres (50 ft) tall. The bark is whitish. The flowers are purple, drying pale pink-brown. The fruits are round and measure up to 1.5 cm (0.6 in) in diameter.

== Distribution and habitat ==
Xanthophyllum reticulatum is endemic to Borneo. Its habitat is mixed dipterocarp forest from sea-level to 400 metres (1,300 ft) altitude.
