= Xanthophyllum havilandii =

Scientific classification
- Kingdom: Plantae
- Clade: Tracheophytes
- Clade: Angiosperms
- Clade: Eudicots
- Clade: Rosids
- Order: Fabales
- Family: Polygalaceae
- Genus: Xanthophyllum
- Species: X. havilandii

Binomial name
- Xanthophyllum havilandii Chodat

Synonyms
- Xanthophyllum hosei Ridl.

Species of flowering plant

Xanthophyllum havilandii is a plant in the family Polygalaceae. It is named for the naturalist George Darby Haviland.

== Description ==
Xanthophyllum havilandii grows as a shrub or small tree up to 5 metres (20 ft) tall with a stem diameter of up to 6 centimetres (2 in). The bark is blackish. The flowers are yellowish when dry. The round fruits measure up to 1.5 cm (1 in) long.

== Distribution and habitat ==
Xanthophyllum havilandii is endemic to Borneo. Its habitat is lowland mixed dipterocarp forests.
