= Gomphogyne =

Scientific classification
- Kingdom: Plantae
- Clade: Embryophytes
- Clade: Tracheophytes
- Clade: Angiosperms
- Clade: Eudicots
- Clade: Rosids
- Order: Cucurbitales
- Family: Cucurbitaceae
- Genus: Gomphogyne; Griff.

Synonyms
- Triceros Griff.

Genus of plants

Gomphogyne is a genus of flowering plants belonging to the family Cucurbitaceae.

Its native range is Himalaya to Philippines.

Species:

- Gomphogyne bonii Gagnep.
- Gomphogyne cissiformis Griff.
- Gomphogyne hainanensis X.L.Zheng
- Gomphogyne heterosperma (Wall.) Kurz
- Gomphogyne longgangensis (X.X.Chen & D.R.Liang) W.J.de Wilde & Duyfjes
- Gomphogyne nepalensis W.J.de Wilde & Duyfjes
- Gomphogyne stenocarpa W.J.de Wilde & Duyfjes
