= Xanthophyllum ovatifolium =

Scientific classification
- Kingdom: Plantae
- Clade: Tracheophytes
- Clade: Angiosperms
- Clade: Eudicots
- Clade: Rosids
- Order: Fabales
- Family: Polygalaceae
- Genus: Xanthophyllum
- Species: X. ovatifolium

Binomial name
- Xanthophyllum ovatifolium Chodat

Species of tree

Xanthophyllum ovatifolium is a tree in the family Polygalaceae. The specific epithet ovatifolium is from the Latin meaning 'egg-shaped leaf'.

== Description ==
Xanthophyllum ovatifolium has unbranched inflorescences bearing four to six flowers. The flowers are white, drying pale brownish.

== Distribution and habitat ==
Xanthophyllum ovatifolium grows naturally in Borneo where it is confined to Sarawak. It may also grow in Sumatra but is considered unlikely there.
