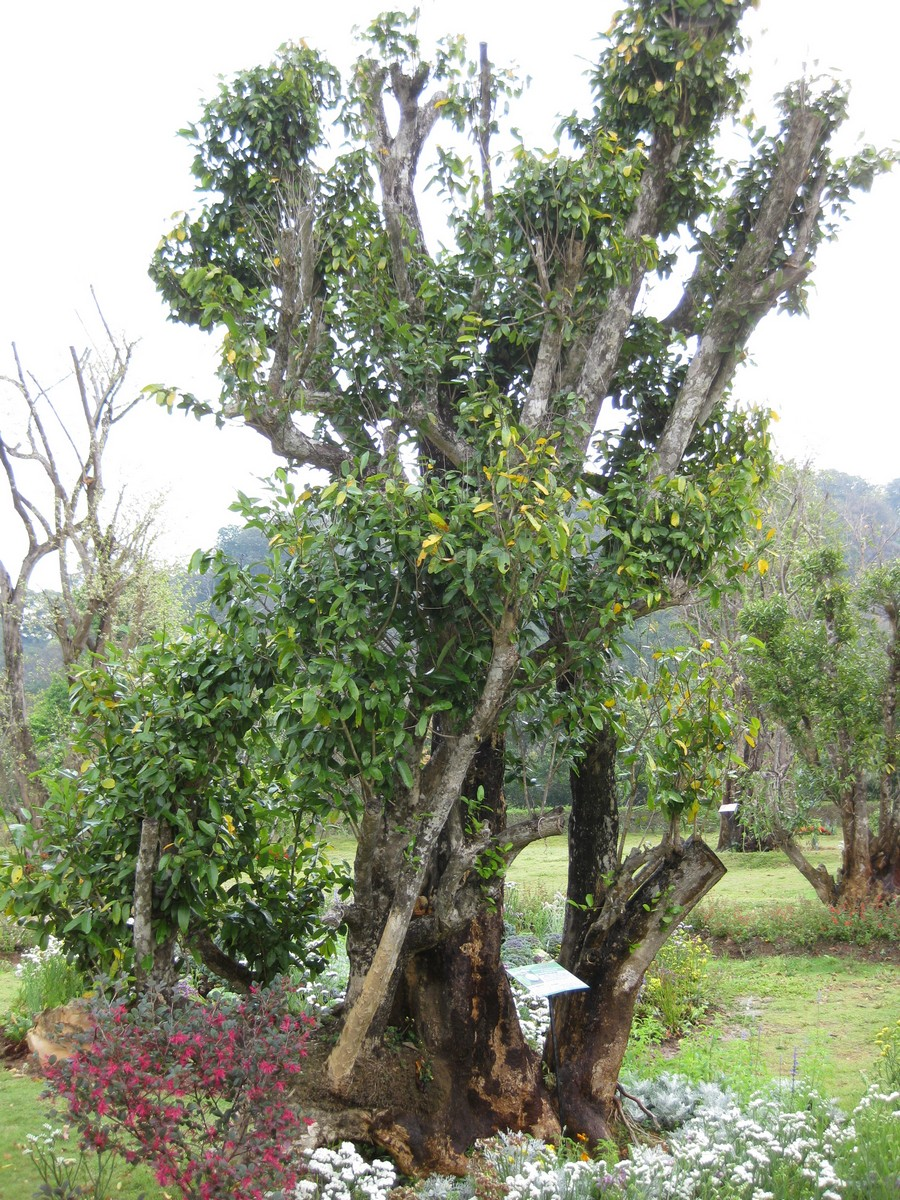
- Xanthophyllum lanceatum at Queen Sirikit Botanic Garden (Thailand)

Scientific classification
- Kingdom: Plantae
- Clade: Tracheophytes
- Clade: Angiosperms
- Clade: Eudicots
- Clade: Rosids
- Order: Fabales
- Family: Polygalaceae
- Genus: Xanthophyllum
- Species: X. lanceatum

Binomial name
- Xanthophyllum lanceatum (Miq.) J.J.Sm.

Synonyms
- Skaphium lanceatum Miq.; Xanthophyllum glaucum Wall. ex Hassk.; Xanthophyllum microcarpum Chodat; Banisterodes glaucum (Wall. ex Hassk.) Kuntze

= Xanthophyllum lanceatum =

Species of tree in the milkwort family

Xanthophyllum lanceatum is a tree in the Polygalaceae family. It grows across Southeast Asia from Sumatera to Bangladesh. The leaves are used as a hops-substitute in beer making and the wood as fuel. Fish in the Mekong regularly eat the fruit, flowers and leaves.

== Description ==
Xanthophyllum lanceatum is a tree that grows some 8–15 m (26–49 ft) tall. Flowering occurs in February and March in Thailand and Cambodia, with fruit appearing from April to July in Thailand.

The wood has an unusual anatomical feature in that amongst the ray cells there are procumbent, square and upright cells mixed throughout.

== Distribution ==
Xanthophyllum lanceatum is found across Southeast Asia, from Sumatera to Bangladesh. Countries and regions that it grows in include: Indonesia (Sumatera); Malaysia (Peninsular); Thailand; Cambodia; Vietnam; Laos; Myanmar; and Bangladesh.

== Habitat and ecology ==
It is found in wetland communities of Southeast Asia.

Along the Phra Prong River (Sa Kaeo Province, eastern Thailand), the riparian vegetation community has large trees scattered along the river bank. The common taxa are Hydnocarpus castaneus, this species, Dipterocarpus alatus, and Crateva magna. They show low natural regeneration, with few saplings and seedling. The two species, H. castaneus and X. lanceatum do show strong tolerance for flooding. Seedlings of the two taxa showed no elongation or biomass suppression, and adventitious roots were found. This indicates that they may play a strong role in vegetation restoration. Elsewhere on the river is the Bodhivijjalaya College campus of Srinakharinwirot University. The riparian forest associated with this campus has the following trees: H. castaneus, Garuga pinnata, C. magna, Hopea odorata, D. alatus, Streblus asper, Knema globularia, Nauclea orientalis, and X. lanceatum.

In the vegetation communities alongside the Mekong in Kratie and Steung Treng Provinces, Cambodia, this taxa is rare in the dense diverse strand community (last to be flooded each year, first to drain). It grows on soils derived from metamorphic sandstone bedrock, at 20–25 m (66–82 ft) altitude.

The fruit, flowers and leaves of this tree have been observed to be regularly eaten by fish by fishers in the Mekong at Khong District, Champasak Province, southern Laos, and the fruit was found amongst the stomach contents of Pangasius polyuranadon fish examined in that area.

== Vernacular names ==
In Thai the tree is known as chumsaeng. Kânsaëng and pumsaèn are names used in Cambodia (Khmer). In Lao the plant is called soum seng.

== Uses ==
The leaves have been used as a hops-substitute in beer making. The wood is used as firewood. The bark is used in folk medicine to treat chickenpox.

The extract from the fruit displayed excellent inhibitory activity against the plant-pathogenic fungus Magnaporthe grisea.

== History ==
The Dutch botanist Johannes Jacobus Smith (1867–1947) described this species in 1912 in the publication Icones Bogorienses (Leiden).
