= Xanthophyllum beccarianum =

Scientific classification
- Kingdom: Plantae
- Clade: Tracheophytes
- Clade: Angiosperms
- Clade: Eudicots
- Clade: Rosids
- Order: Fabales
- Family: Polygalaceae
- Genus: Xanthophyllum
- Species: X. beccarianum

Binomial name
- Xanthophyllum beccarianum Chodat

Species of tree

Xanthophyllum beccarianum is a tree in the family Polygalaceae. It is named for the Italian botanist Odoardo Beccari.

== Description ==
Xanthophyllum beccarianum grows up to 12 metres (40 ft) tall with a trunk diameter of up to 17 centimetres (7 in). The bark is grey-green and smooth. The flowers are orange-red when dry. The round fruits measure up to 1.5 cm (1 in) in diameter.

== Distribution and habitat ==
Xanthophyllum beccarianum is endemic to Borneo. Its habitat is mixed dipterocarp forests from sea-level to 200 metres (700 ft) altitude.
