= Xanthophyllum pseudoadenotus =

Scientific classification
- Kingdom: Plantae
- Clade: Tracheophytes
- Clade: Angiosperms
- Clade: Eudicots
- Clade: Rosids
- Order: Fabales
- Family: Polygalaceae
- Genus: Xanthophyllum
- Species: X. pseudoadenotus

Binomial name
- Xanthophyllum pseudoadenotus Meijden

Species of tree

Xanthophyllum pseudoadenotus is a plant in the family Polygalaceae. The specific epithet pseudoadenotus is from the Greek, referring to the plant's resemblance to X. adenotus.

== Description ==
Xanthophyllum pseudoadenotus grows as a shrub or tree up to 12 metres (40 ft) tall. The flowers dry brownish orange. The round fruits are greenish or brown and measure up to 1.5 cm (0.6 in) in diameter.

== Distribution and habitat ==
Xanthophyllum pseudoadenotus is endemic to Borneo. Its habitat is forest on stream banks, at around 200 metres (700 ft) altitude.
