= Xanthophyllum velutinum =

Scientific classification
- Kingdom: Plantae
- Clade: Tracheophytes
- Clade: Angiosperms
- Clade: Eudicots
- Clade: Rosids
- Order: Fabales
- Family: Polygalaceae
- Genus: Xanthophyllum
- Species: X. velutinum

Binomial name
- Xanthophyllum velutinum Chodat

Species of tree

Xanthophyllum velutinum is a tree in the family Polygalaceae. The specific epithet velutinum is from the Latin meaning 'velvety', referring to the twig and leaf undersides.

== Description ==
Xanthophyllum velutinum grows up to 25 metres (80 ft) tall with a trunk diameter of up to 20 centimetres (8 in). The smooth bark is grey or pale brown. The flowers are yellow or white, drying brownish orange. The brown fruits are ovoid and measure up to 2.5 cm (1 in) in diameter.

== Distribution and habitat ==
Xanthophyllum velutinum is endemic to Borneo. Its habitat is mixed dipterocarp, old secondary, riverine or lower montane forests from sea-level to 900 metres (3,000 ft) altitude.
