= Xanthophyllum subcoriaceum =

Scientific classification
- Kingdom: Plantae
- Clade: Tracheophytes
- Clade: Angiosperms
- Clade: Eudicots
- Clade: Rosids
- Order: Fabales
- Family: Polygalaceae
- Genus: Xanthophyllum
- Species: X. subcoriaceum

Binomial name
- Xanthophyllum subcoriaceum (Chodat) Meijden

Species of flowering plant

Xanthophyllum subcoriaceum is a plant in the family Polygalaceae. The specific epithet subcoriaceum is from the Latin meaning 'somewhat leathery', referring to the leaves.

== Description ==
Xanthophyllum subcoriaceum grows as a shrub or tree up to 18 metres (60 ft) tall with a trunk diameter of up to 20 centimetres (8 in). The hard smooth bark is whitish or brownish. The flowers are white, drying orange. The round fruits are pale green to brown and measure up to 1.7 cm (0.7 in) in diameter.

== Distribution and habitat ==
Xanthophyllum subcoriaceum is endemic to Borneo. Its habitat is lowland swamp forest and mixed dipterocarp forest from sea-level to 700 metres (2,300 ft) altitude.
