= Xanthophyllum schizocarpon =

Scientific classification
- Kingdom: Plantae
- Clade: Tracheophytes
- Clade: Angiosperms
- Clade: Eudicots
- Clade: Rosids
- Order: Fabales
- Family: Polygalaceae
- Genus: Xanthophyllum
- Species: X. schizocarpon

Binomial name
- Xanthophyllum schizocarpon Chodat

Species of plant

Xanthophyllum schizocarpon is a tree in the family Polygalaceae. The specific epithet schizocarpon is from the Greek meaning 'split fruit', referring to the deeply furrowed fruit.

== Description ==
Xanthophyllum schizocarpon grows up to 25 metres (80 ft) tall with a trunk diameter of up to 35 centimetres (14 in). The smooth bark is grey or brownish. The flowers are yellow. The roundish fruits are greenish to yellowish brown and measure up to 1.5 cm (0.6 in) in diameter.

== Distribution and habitat ==
Xanthophyllum schizocarpon is endemic to Borneo. Its habitat is mixed dipterocarp forests from sea-level to 800 metres (2,600 ft) altitude.
