= Xanthophyllum ecarinatum =

Scientific classification
- Kingdom: Plantae
- Clade: Tracheophytes
- Clade: Angiosperms
- Clade: Eudicots
- Clade: Rosids
- Order: Fabales
- Family: Polygalaceae
- Genus: Xanthophyllum
- Species: X. ecarinatum

Binomial name
- Xanthophyllum ecarinatum Chodat

Species of tree

Xanthophyllum ecarinatum is a tree in the family Polygalaceae. The specific epithet ecarinatum is from the Latin meaning 'not keeled', referring to the fact that the petals do not form the shape of a boat (or carina).

== Description ==
Xanthophyllum ecarinatum grows up to 25 metres (80 ft) tall with a trunk diameter of up to 16 centimetres (6 in). The smooth bark is pale grey or brown. The flowers are white when fresh. The edible fruits are ellipsoid, coloured orange to dark brown and measure up to 11 cm (4 in) long.

== Distribution and habitat ==
Xanthophyllum ecarinatum is endemic to Borneo. Its habitat is forests from sea-level to 1,250 metres (4,000 ft) altitude.
