= Xanthophyllum trichocladum =

Scientific classification
- Kingdom: Plantae
- Clade: Tracheophytes
- Clade: Angiosperms
- Clade: Eudicots
- Clade: Rosids
- Order: Fabales
- Family: Polygalaceae
- Genus: Xanthophyllum
- Species: X. trichocladum

Binomial name
- Xanthophyllum trichocladum Chodat

Species of flowering plant

Xanthophyllum trichocladum is a plant in the family Polygalaceae. The specific epithet trichocladum is from the Greek meaning 'hairy twig'.

== Description ==
Xanthophyllum trichocladum grows as a shrub or tree up to 18 metres (60 ft) tall with a trunk diameter of up to 25 centimetres (10 in). The bark is whitish or yellowish grey. The flowers are pink, drying dark reddish. The fruits are round and measure up to 1.5 cm (0.6 in) in diameter.

== Distribution and habitat ==
Xanthophyllum trichocladum is endemic to Borneo. Its habitat is mixed dipterocarp forest from sea-level to 500 metres (1,600 ft) altitude.
