= Gomphogyne cissiformis =

Scientific classification
- Kingdom: Plantae
- Clade: Tracheophytes
- Clade: Angiosperms
- Clade: Eudicots
- Clade: Rosids
- Order: Cucurbitales
- Family: Cucurbitaceae
- Genus: Gomphogyne
- Species: G. cissiformis

Binomial name
- Gomphogyne cissiformis Griff.

Synonyms
- Gomphogyne alleizettei Gagnep.; Gomphogyne cissiformis var. villosa Cogn.; Gomphogyne cissiformis f. villosa (Cogn.) Mizush.

Species of plant

Gomphogyne cissiformis is a species of flowering plant in the family Cucurbitaceae, native to the Himalayas, Assam, Yunnan, and Vietnam. A climber, it is typically found in mountain forests, at elevations from 2,100 to 2,800 m (6,900 to 9,200 ft). Its fruit is edible and is collected in the wild by local peoples.
