= Salvia plectranthoides =

Scientific classification
- Kingdom: Plantae
- Clade: Tracheophytes
- Clade: Angiosperms
- Clade: Eudicots
- Clade: Asterids
- Order: Lamiales
- Family: Lamiaceae
- Genus: Salvia
- Species: S. plectranthoides

Binomial name
- Salvia plectranthoides Griff.

Synonyms
- Salvia japonica var. gracillima Diels; Salvia japonica var. kaiscianensis Pamp.; Salvia japonica var. parvifoliola Hemsl.; Salvia tuberifera H.Lév.

Species of flowering plant

Salvia plectranthoides is a species of flowering plant in the family Lamiaceae. It is an annual or biennial plant that is native to Guangxi, Guizhou, Hubei, Shaanxi, Sichuan, and Yunnan provinces in China, along with Bhutan and Sikkim in India. It is typically found growing on hillsides, along valley streams, and forests at 800 to 2,500 m (2,600 to 8,200 ft) elevation. S. plectranthoides grows on one to a few erect or ascending stems 20 to 43 cm (7.9 to 16.9 in) tall. Inflorescences are widely spaced verticillasters in elongated racemes or panicles, with a corolla that is red to purplish or purple-blue, rarely white, and 1.1 to 2 cm (0.43 to 0.79 in).
