= Xanthophyllum nitidum =

Scientific classification
- Kingdom: Plantae
- Clade: Tracheophytes
- Clade: Angiosperms
- Clade: Eudicots
- Clade: Rosids
- Order: Fabales
- Family: Polygalaceae
- Genus: Xanthophyllum
- Species: X. nitidum

Binomial name
- Xanthophyllum nitidum W.J.de Wilde & Duyfjes

Species of tree

Xanthophyllum nitidum is a tree in the family Polygalaceae. The specific epithet nitidum is from the Latin meaning 'shiny', referring to the leaf surfaces.

== Description ==
Xanthophyllum nitidum grows up to 30 metres (100 ft) tall with a trunk diameter of up to 35 centimetres (14 in). The bark is black and smooth.

== Distribution and habitat ==
Xanthophyllum nitidum is endemic to Borneo. Its habitat is lowland forests from 100 metres (300 ft) to 400 metres (1,300 ft) altitude.
