= Xanthophyllum clovis =

Scientific classification
- Kingdom: Plantae
- Clade: Tracheophytes
- Clade: Angiosperms
- Clade: Eudicots
- Clade: Rosids
- Order: Fabales
- Family: Polygalaceae
- Genus: Xanthophyllum
- Species: X. clovis

Binomial name
- Xanthophyllum clovis (Steenis ex Meijden) Meijden

Synonyms
- Xanthophyllum vitellinum var. clovis Steenis ex Meijden

Species of tree

Xanthophyllum clovis is a tree in the family Polygalaceae. The specific epithet clovis is from the French meaning 'nail' or 'clove', referring to the clove-like appearance of the buds.

== Description ==
Xanthophyllum clovis grows up to 16 metres (50 ft) tall with a trunk diameter of up to 19 centimetres (7 in). The bark is greyish. The flowers are dark red when dry. The edible fruits are round and measure up to 2 cm (1 in) in diameter.

== Distribution and habitat ==
Xanthophyllum clovis is endemic to Borneo. Its habitat is lowland mixed dipterocarp or swamp forests.
