= Xanthophyllum rectum =

Scientific classification
- Kingdom: Plantae
- Clade: Tracheophytes
- Clade: Angiosperms
- Clade: Eudicots
- Clade: Rosids
- Order: Fabales
- Family: Polygalaceae
- Genus: Xanthophyllum
- Species: X. rectum

Binomial name
- Xanthophyllum rectum W.J.de Wilde & Duyfjes

Species of tree

Xanthophyllum rectum is a tree in the family Polygalaceae. The specific epithet rectum is from the Latin meaning 'upright', referring to the inflorescences.

== Description ==
Xanthophyllum rectum grows up to 12 metres (40 ft) tall with a trunk diameter of up to 20 centimetres (8 in). The smooth bark is pale grey. The dark brown fruits are round and measure up to 1.8 cm (1 in) in diameter.

== Distribution and habitat ==
Xanthophyllum rectum is endemic to Borneo and confined to Sarawak. Its habitats include kerangas and dipterocarp forests.
