= Xanthophyllum montanum =

Scientific classification
- Kingdom: Plantae
- Clade: Embryophytes
- Clade: Tracheophytes
- Clade: Angiosperms
- Clade: Eudicots
- Clade: Rosids
- Order: Fabales
- Family: Polygalaceae
- Genus: Xanthophyllum
- Species: X. montanum

Binomial name
- Xanthophyllum montanum Meijden

Species of tree

Xanthophyllum montanum is a tree in the family Polygalaceae. The specific epithet montanum is from the Latin meaning 'mountainous', referring to the tree's habitat.

== Description ==
Xanthophyllum montanum grows up to 30 metres (100 ft) tall with a trunk diameter of up to 30 centimetres (10 in). The smooth bark is orange-yellowish to green. The flowers are yellowish brown when dry. The round fruits are yellowish to greenish brown and measure up to 1 cm (0.4 in) in diameter.

== Distribution and habitat ==
Xanthophyllum montanum is endemic to Borneo and known only from Mount Kinabalu in Malaysia's Sabah state. Its habitat is lower montane rain forest from 900 metres (3,000 ft) to 1,600 metres (5,000 ft) elevation.
