= Xanthophyllum ellipticum =

Scientific classification
- Kingdom: Plantae
- Clade: Tracheophytes
- Clade: Angiosperms
- Clade: Eudicots
- Clade: Rosids
- Order: Fabales
- Family: Polygalaceae
- Genus: Xanthophyllum
- Species: X. ellipticum

Binomial name
- Xanthophyllum ellipticum Korth. ex Miq.

Synonyms
- Banisteroides ellipticum (Korth. ex Miq.) Kuntze; Xanthophyllum hildebrandii Meijden

Species of flowering plant

Xanthophyllum ellipticum is a plant in the family Polygalaceae. The specific epithet ellipticum is from the Latin meaning 'elliptical', referring to the leaves.

== Description ==
Xanthophyllum ellipticum grows as a shrub or tree up to 30 metres (100 ft) tall with a trunk diameter of up to 40 centimetres (16 in). The smooth bark is grey or reddish brown. The flowers are white or pale yellow, drying brown or dark orange. The round fruits are initially orange, drying to brown or blackish. They measure up to 2.2 cm (1 in) in diameter.

== Distribution and habitat ==
Xanthophyllum ellipticum grows naturally in Thailand, Sumatra, Peninsular Malaysia, Singapore and Borneo. Its habitat is lowland forests from sea-level to 650 metres (2,000 ft) altitude.
