= Xanthophyllum neglectum =

Scientific classification
- Kingdom: Plantae
- Clade: Tracheophytes
- Clade: Angiosperms
- Clade: Eudicots
- Clade: Rosids
- Order: Fabales
- Family: Polygalaceae
- Genus: Xanthophyllum
- Species: X. neglectum

Binomial name
- Xanthophyllum neglectum Meijden

Species of tree

Xanthophyllum neglectum is a tree in the family Polygalaceae. The specific epithet neglectum is from the Latin meaning 'neglected', referring to how the species has been long overlooked.

== Description ==
Xanthophyllum neglectum grows up to 20 metres (70 ft) tall with a trunk diameter of up to 20 centimetres (10 in). The smooth bark is greyish, greenish brown or dark green. The flowers are white or yellowish, drying pale brownish. The greyish green fruits are round and measure up to 1 cm (0.4 in) in diameter.

== Distribution and habitat ==
Xanthophyllum neglectum is endemic to Borneo. Its habitat is mixed dipterocarp or lower montane forests from sea-level to 600 metres (2,000 ft) altitude.
