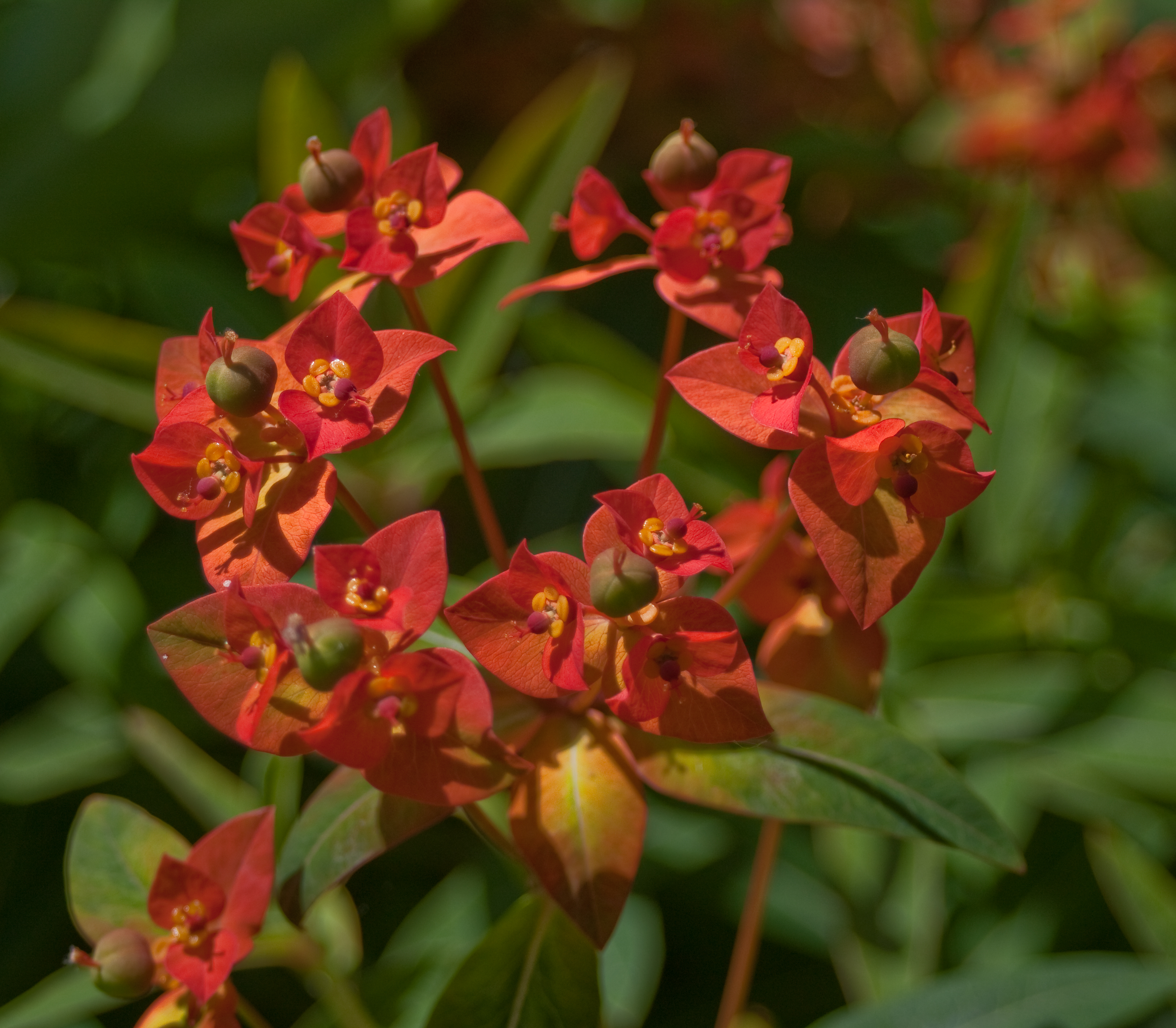

Scientific classification
- Kingdom: Plantae
- Clade: Tracheophytes
- Clade: Angiosperms
- Clade: Eudicots
- Clade: Rosids
- Order: Malpighiales
- Family: Euphorbiaceae
- Genus: Euphorbia
- Species: E. griffithii

Binomial name
- Euphorbia griffithii Hook.f.

= Euphorbia griffithii =

Species of flowering plant

Euphorbia griffithii, the Griffith's spurge, is a species of flowering plant in the spurge family, Euphorbiaceae.

== Description ==
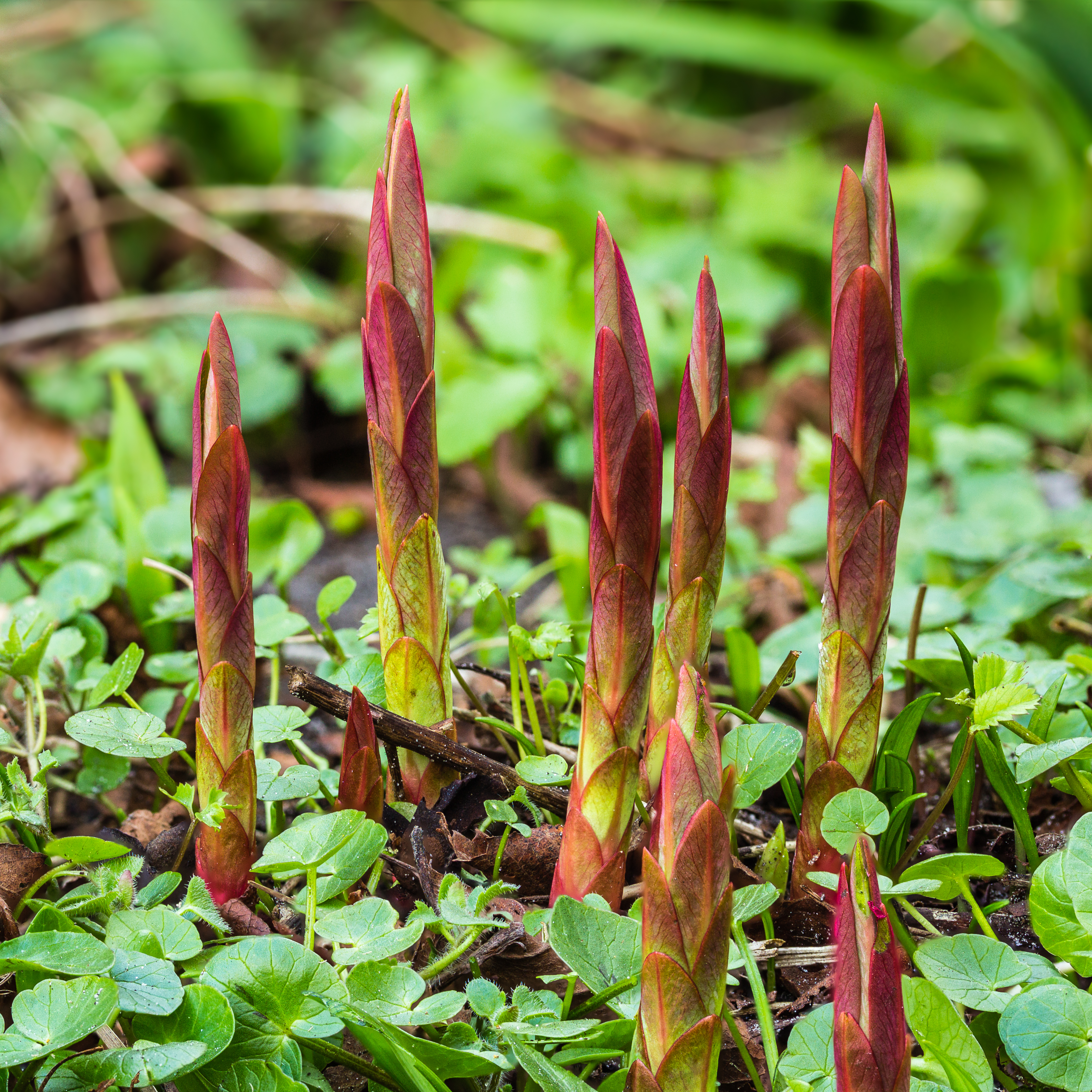
New ground shoots in spring

It is a spreading, herbaceous perennial plant that grows from a rhizome. It can reach 90 cm (35 in) in height, with many erect reddish stems. The narrow leaves are dark green with red central veins, turning red and yellow in autumn. In summer it produces flowerheads (cyathia) of brilliant red and yellow.

== Etymology ==
The Latin specific epithet griffithii refers to William Griffith (1810-1845), a British naturalist and botanist.

== Distribution and habitat ==
The plant is native to Bhutan, Tibet and southwest China. It is vigorous and can be invasive.

== Cultivation ==
Numerous cultivars have been selected for garden use, including 'Dixter' and ‘Fireglow”.
