= Xanthophyllum pubescens =

Conservation status
- Conservation Dependent (IUCN 2.3)

Scientific classification
- Kingdom: Plantae
- Clade: Tracheophytes
- Clade: Angiosperms
- Clade: Eudicots
- Clade: Rosids
- Order: Fabales
- Family: Polygalaceae
- Genus: Xanthophyllum
- Species: X. pubescens

Binomial name
- Xanthophyllum pubescens R. van der Meijden

Species of flowering plant

Xanthophyllum pubescens is a species of plant in the family Polygalaceae. It is endemic to Peninsular Malaysia.
