= Xanthophyllum impressum =

Scientific classification
- Kingdom: Plantae
- Clade: Tracheophytes
- Clade: Angiosperms
- Clade: Eudicots
- Clade: Rosids
- Order: Fabales
- Family: Polygalaceae
- Genus: Xanthophyllum
- Species: X. impressum

Binomial name
- Xanthophyllum impressum Meijden

Species of tree

Xanthophyllum impressum is a tree in the family Polygalaceae. The specific epithet impressum is from the Latin meaning 'impressed', referring to the enclosed position of the axillary buds.

== Description ==
Xanthophyllum impressum grows up to 23 metres (80 ft) tall with a trunk diameter of up to 70 centimetres (30 in). The smooth bark is grey. The flowers are white, drying orange to dark red. The brownish fruits are round and measure up to 1.7 cm (1 in) in diameter.

== Distribution and habitat ==
Xanthophyllum impressum grows naturally in Borneo and the Philippines. Its habitat is lowland forests.
