= Xanthophyllum longum =

Conservation status
- Critically Endangered (IUCN 3.1)

Scientific classification
- Kingdom: Plantae
- Clade: Tracheophytes
- Clade: Angiosperms
- Clade: Eudicots
- Clade: Rosids
- Order: Fabales
- Family: Polygalaceae
- Genus: Xanthophyllum
- Species: X. longum

Binomial name
- Xanthophyllum longum W.J.de Wilde & Duyfjes

Species of tree

Xanthophyllum longum is a tree in the family Polygalaceae. The specific epithet longum is from the Latin meaning 'long', referring to the petioles.

== Description ==
Xanthophyllum longum grows up to 5 metres (20 ft) tall with a trunk diameter of up to 10 centimetres (4 in). The bark is pale greenish or blackish. The brownish fruits are round and measure up to 1.7 cm (1 in) in diameter.

== Range and habitat ==
Xanthophyllum longum is endemic to Borneo and known only from Sabah, where it is known only from Sg Pinangah Forest Reserve. The species' current estimated extent of occurrence (EOO) and area of occupancy (AOO) are 4 km^{2}. It grows in lowland rain forests along streams and on hillsides on undulating land between 350 and 500 metres elevation.

== Conservation ==
Urbanization and habitat loss have reduced its area of occupancy by 67%, and its extent of occurrence (EOO) by over 90%. The species' remaining population is within a commercial forest reserve, which is open to logging. Its conservation status is assessed as critically endangered.
