= Xanthophyllum reflexum =

Scientific classification
- Kingdom: Plantae
- Clade: Tracheophytes
- Clade: Angiosperms
- Clade: Eudicots
- Clade: Rosids
- Order: Fabales
- Family: Polygalaceae
- Genus: Xanthophyllum
- Species: X. reflexum

Binomial name
- Xanthophyllum reflexum Meijden

Species of tree

Xanthophyllum reflexum is a tree in the family Polygalaceae. The specific epithet reflexum is from the Latin meaning 'bent backwards', referring to the flower petals.

== Description ==
Xanthophyllum reflexum grows up to 16 metres (50 ft) tall with a trunk diameter of up to 20 centimetres (10 in). The smooth bark is whitish brown or greenish yellow. The flowers are yellowish white, drying dark red.

== Distribution and habitat ==
Xanthophyllum reflexum is endemic to Borneo and confined to Sarawak. Its habitat is lowland mixed dipterocarp forest.
