= Xanthophyllum penibukanense =

Scientific classification
- Kingdom: Plantae
- Clade: Tracheophytes
- Clade: Angiosperms
- Clade: Eudicots
- Clade: Rosids
- Order: Fabales
- Family: Polygalaceae
- Genus: Xanthophyllum
- Species: X. penibukanense

Binomial name
- Xanthophyllum penibukanense Heine

Species of tree

Xanthophyllum penibukanense is a plant in the family Polygalaceae. It is named for the village of Penibukan in Malaysia's Sabah state.

== Description ==
Xanthophyllum penibukanense grows as a shrub or tree up to 12 metres (40 ft) tall with a trunk diameter of up to 20 centimetres (10 in). The smooth bark is grey or green. The flowers are creamy white to pale purplish, drying orange. The brownish fruits are round and measure up to 1.5 cm (1 in) in diameter.

== Distribution and habitat ==
Xanthophyllum penibukanense is endemic to Borneo. Its habitat is lowland mixed dipterocarp forests or lower montane forests from sea-level to 1,500 metres (5,000 ft) altitude.
