= Xanthophyllum purpureum =

Scientific classification
- Kingdom: Plantae
- Clade: Tracheophytes
- Clade: Angiosperms
- Clade: Eudicots
- Clade: Rosids
- Order: Fabales
- Family: Polygalaceae
- Genus: Xanthophyllum
- Species: X. purpureum

Binomial name
- Xanthophyllum purpureum Ridl.

Species of flowering plant

Xanthophyllum purpureum is a plant in the family Polygalaceae. The specific epithet purpureum is from the Latin meaning 'purple', referring to the flowers.

== Description ==
Xanthophyllum purpureum grows as a shrub or small tree up to 6 metres (20 ft) tall with a trunk diameter of up to 20 centimetres (10 in). The smooth bark is whitish or brown. The flowers are purple to rose-violet, drying orange-red. The pale yellow-brown fruits are round and measure up to 1.5 cm (0.6 in) in diameter. The wood is used in construction in Kalimantan.

== Distribution and habitat ==
Xanthophyllum purpureum is endemic to Borneo. Its habitat is mixed dipterocarp forests or lower montane forests from sea-level to 1,100 metres (3,600 ft) altitude.
