= Xanthophyllum brevipes =

Scientific classification
- Kingdom: Plantae
- Clade: Tracheophytes
- Clade: Angiosperms
- Clade: Eudicots
- Clade: Rosids
- Order: Fabales
- Family: Polygalaceae
- Genus: Xanthophyllum
- Species: X. brevipes

Binomial name
- Xanthophyllum brevipes Meijden

Species of tree

Xanthophyllum brevipes is a tree in the family Polygalaceae. The specific epithet brevipes is from the Latin meaning 'short foot', referring to the short petiole of the leaves.

== Description ==
Xanthophyllum brevipes grows up to 30 metres (100 ft) tall with a trunk diameter of up to 40 centimetres (16 in). The bark is yellowish brown and smooth. The flowers are white drying to orange-brown. The brown or blackish fruits are pear-shaped to ovoid and measure up to 5 cm (2 in) in diameter.

== Distribution and habitat ==
Xanthophyllum brevipes is endemic to Borneo. Its habitat is mixed dipterocarp forests from sea-level to 100 metres (300 ft) altitude.
