= Xanthophyllum pulchrum =

Conservation status
- Least Concern (IUCN 3.1)

Scientific classification
- Kingdom: Plantae
- Clade: Tracheophytes
- Clade: Angiosperms
- Clade: Eudicots
- Clade: Rosids
- Order: Fabales
- Family: Polygalaceae
- Genus: Xanthophyllum
- Species: X. pulchrum

Binomial name
- Xanthophyllum pulchrum King

Species of flowering plant

Xanthophyllum pulchrum is a species of flowering plant in the family Polygalaceae. The specific epithet pulchrum is from the Latin meaning 'beautiful', referring to the plant's appearance.

== Description ==
Xanthophyllum pulchrum grows as a shrub or tree up to 30 metres (100 ft) tall with a trunk diameter of up to 30 centimetres (10 in). The smooth bark is grey, brown or greenish. The flowers are pink or whitish, drying red or brownish orange. The pale brown fruits are round and measure up to 2 cm (1 in) in diameter.

== Distribution and habitat ==
Xanthophyllum pulchrum grows naturally in Peninsular Malaysia and Borneo. Its habitat is mixed dipterocarp forests or swampy terrain from sea-level to 1,000 metres (3,300 ft) altitude.
