= Xanthophyllum borneense =

Scientific classification
- Kingdom: Plantae
- Clade: Tracheophytes
- Clade: Angiosperms
- Clade: Eudicots
- Clade: Rosids
- Order: Fabales
- Family: Polygalaceae
- Genus: Xanthophyllum
- Species: X. borneense

Binomial name
- Xanthophyllum borneense Miq.

Species of tree

Xanthophyllum borneense is a tree in the family Polygalaceae. It is named for Borneo.

== Description ==
Xanthophyllum borneense grows up to 8 metres (30 ft) tall. The bark is grey-green and smooth. The flowers are pale brownish, drying orange. The pale brown fruits are round to ovoid and measure up to 1.8 cm (1 in) in diameter.

== Distribution and habitat ==
Xanthophyllum borneense is endemic to Borneo. Its habitat is riverine forests and on hills, from sea-level to 300 metres (1,000 ft) altitude.
