= Xanthophyllum obscurum =

Scientific classification
- Kingdom: Plantae
- Clade: Tracheophytes
- Clade: Angiosperms
- Clade: Eudicots
- Clade: Rosids
- Order: Fabales
- Family: Polygalaceae
- Genus: Xanthophyllum
- Species: X. obscurum

Binomial name
- Xanthophyllum obscurum A.W.Benn.

Synonyms
- Banisteroides obscurum (A.W.Benn.) Kuntze

Species of plant in the milkwort family

Xanthophyllum obscurum is a tree in the family Polygalaceae. The specific epithet obscurum is from the Latin meaning 'dark', referring to the dark colour of the dried flowers and fruits.

== Description ==
Xanthophyllum obscurum grows up to 35 metres (110 ft) tall with a trunk diameter of up to 55 centimetres (20 in). The smooth bark is pale and brown-grey. The flowers are white or purple. The edible, round fruits are brown or blackish and measure up to 14 cm (6 in) in diameter.

== Distribution and habitat ==
Xanthophyllum obscurum grows naturally in southern Thailand and western Malesia. Its habitat is lowland mixed dipterocarp and lower montane forests from sea-level to 1,800 metres (6,000 ft) altitude.
