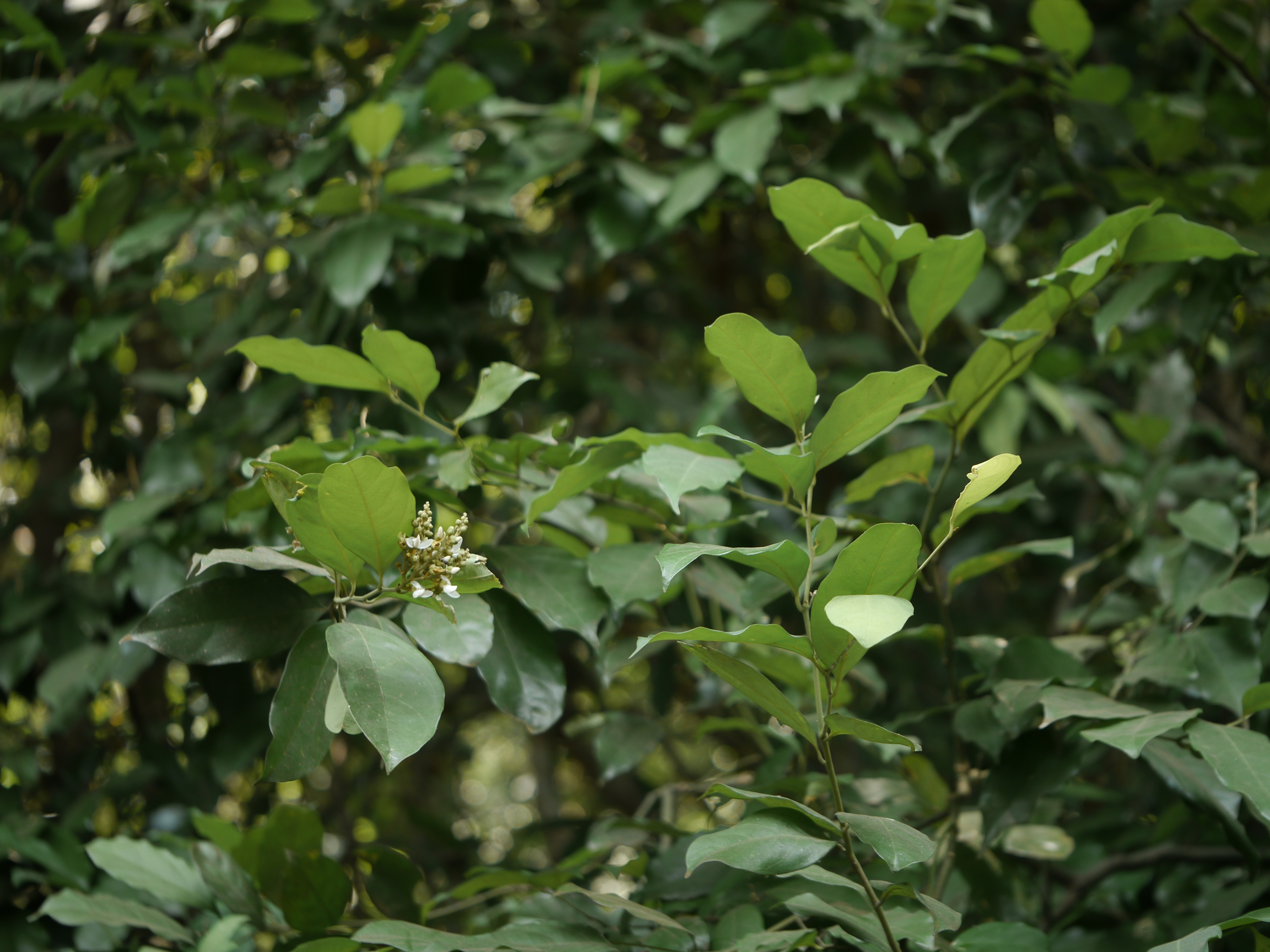

Scientific classification
- Kingdom: Plantae
- Clade: Tracheophytes
- Clade: Angiosperms
- Clade: Eudicots
- Clade: Rosids
- Order: Fabales
- Family: Polygalaceae
- Genus: Xanthophyllum
- Species: X. flavescens

Binomial name
- Xanthophyllum flavescens Roxb.

Synonyms
- Banisteroides affine (Korth. ex Miq.) Kuntze; Xanthophyllum affine Korth. ex Miq.; Xanthophyllum siamense Craib

= Xanthophyllum flavescens =

Species of flowering plant

Xanthophyllum flavescens is a plant in the family Polygalaceae. The specific epithet flavescens is from the Latin meaning "becoming yellow', referring to the leaves.

== Description ==
Xanthophyllum flavescens grows as a shrub or tree up to 30 metres (100 ft) tall with a trunk diameter of up to 80 centimetres (30 in). The bark is grey or greenish brown. The flowers are yellow, white or pink. The brown fruits are round and measure up to 2 cm (1 in) in diameter.

== Distribution and habitat ==
Xanthophyllum flavescens grows naturally in continental Southeast Asia and western Malesia. Its habitat is mixed dipterocarp or montane forests from sea-level to 2,000 metres (6,600 ft) altitude.
