= Xanthophyllum parvifolium =

Scientific classification
- Kingdom: Plantae
- Clade: Tracheophytes
- Clade: Angiosperms
- Clade: Eudicots
- Clade: Rosids
- Order: Fabales
- Family: Polygalaceae
- Genus: Xanthophyllum
- Species: X. parvifolium

Binomial name
- Xanthophyllum parvifolium Meijden

Species of tree

Xanthophyllum parvifolium is a tree in the family Polygalaceae. The specific epithet parvifolium is from the Latin meaning 'small leaves'.

== Description ==
Xanthophyllum parvifolium grows up to 25 metres (80 ft) tall with a trunk diameter of up to 30 centimetres (10 in). The smooth bark is greyish or yellowish. The flowers are pale orange, drying orange brown. The pale brown fruits are round and measure up to 1.2 cm (0.5 in) in diameter.

== Distribution and habitat ==
Xanthophyllum parvifolium is endemic to Borneo. Its habitat is mixed dipterocarp and kerangas forests from 30 metres (100 ft) to 1,200 metres (4,000 ft) altitude.
