= Xanthophyllum rufum =

Scientific classification
- Kingdom: Plantae
- Clade: Tracheophytes
- Clade: Angiosperms
- Clade: Eudicots
- Clade: Rosids
- Order: Fabales
- Family: Polygalaceae
- Genus: Xanthophyllum
- Species: X. rufum

Binomial name
- Xanthophyllum rufum A.W.Benn.

Synonyms
- Banisteroides rufum (A.W.Benn.) Kuntze

Species of plant in the milkwort family

Xanthophyllum rufum is a plant in the family Polygalaceae. The specific epithet rufum is from the Latin meaning 'reddish', referring to the colour of the twig hairs.

== Description ==
Xanthophyllum rufum grows as a shrub (rarely) or tree up to 40 metres (130 ft) tall with a trunk diameter of up to 50 centimetres (20 in). The smooth bark is greenish grey or brown. The flowers are white, drying yellowish. The yellowish-green fruits are round and measure up to 2 cm (1 in) in diameter.

== Distribution and habitat ==
Xanthophyllum rufum grows naturally in Sumatra, Peninsular Malaysia and Borneo. Its habitat is lowland mixed dipterocarp or riverine forests from sea-level to 300 metres (1,000 ft) altitude.
