= Xanthophyllum pachycarpon =

Scientific classification
- Kingdom: Plantae
- Clade: Tracheophytes
- Clade: Angiosperms
- Clade: Eudicots
- Clade: Rosids
- Order: Fabales
- Family: Polygalaceae
- Genus: Xanthophyllum
- Species: X. pachycarpon

Binomial name
- Xanthophyllum pachycarpon W.J.de Wilde & Duyfjes

Species of tree

Xanthophyllum pachycarpon is a tree in the family Polygalaceae. The specific epithet pachycarpon is from the Greek meaning 'thick fruit', referring to the thick wall of the fruit.

== Description ==
Xanthophyllum pachycarpon grows up to 30 metres (100 ft) tall with a trunk diameter of up to 30 centimetres (12 in). The smooth bark is greyish or dark green. The light brown fruits are round and measure up to 3 cm (1 in) in diameter.

== Distribution and habitat ==
Xanthophyllum pachycarpon is endemic to Borneo. Its habitat is mixed dipterocarp forests from sea-level to 650 metres (2,000 ft) altitude.
