= Xanthophyllum sulphureum =

Conservation status
- Vulnerable (IUCN 2.3)

Scientific classification
- Kingdom: Plantae
- Clade: Tracheophytes
- Clade: Angiosperms
- Clade: Eudicots
- Clade: Rosids
- Order: Fabales
- Family: Polygalaceae
- Genus: Xanthophyllum
- Species: X. sulphureum

Binomial name
- Xanthophyllum sulphureum King

Species of tree

Xanthophyllum sulphureum is a species of flowering plant in the family Polygalaceae. It is a tree endemic to Peninsular Malaysia. It is threatened by habitat loss.
