= Xanthophyllum korthalsianum =

Scientific classification
- Kingdom: Plantae
- Clade: Tracheophytes
- Clade: Angiosperms
- Clade: Eudicots
- Clade: Rosids
- Order: Fabales
- Family: Polygalaceae
- Genus: Xanthophyllum
- Species: X. korthalsianum

Binomial name
- Xanthophyllum korthalsianum Miq.

Species of tree

Xanthophyllum korthalsianum is a tree in the family Polygalaceae. It is named for the Dutch botanist Pieter Willem Korthals.

== Description ==
Xanthophyllum korthalsianum grows up to 25 metres (80 ft) tall with a trunk diameter of up to 30 centimetres (12 in). The inflorescences are branched and may be much longer than the leaves.

== Distribution and habitat ==
Xanthophyllum korthalsianum is a rare species, growing naturally in Sumatra and Borneo. Its habitat is ridge forest at around 200 metres (700 ft) altitude.
