= Xanthophyllum resupinatum =

Scientific classification
- Kingdom: Plantae
- Clade: Tracheophytes
- Clade: Angiosperms
- Clade: Eudicots
- Clade: Rosids
- Order: Fabales
- Family: Polygalaceae
- Genus: Xanthophyllum
- Species: X. resupinatum

Binomial name
- Xanthophyllum resupinatum Meijden

Species of tree

Xanthophyllum resupinatum is a tree in the family Polygalaceae. The specific epithet resupinatum is from the Latin meaning 'upside-down appearance', referring to the leaves.

== Description ==
Xanthophyllum resupinatum grows up to 25 metres (80 ft) tall with a trunk diameter of up to 40 centimetres (16 in). The smooth bark is grey or brown. The flowers are white, drying dark brownish. The round fruits are blackish and measure up to 1.2 cm (0.5 in) in diameter.

== Distribution and habitat ==
Xanthophyllum resupinatum is endemic to Borneo. Its habitat is mixed dipterocarp forest from sea-level to 600 metres (2,000 ft) altitude.
