= Xanthophyllum pauciflorum =

Scientific classification
- Kingdom: Plantae
- Clade: Tracheophytes
- Clade: Angiosperms
- Clade: Eudicots
- Clade: Rosids
- Order: Fabales
- Family: Polygalaceae
- Genus: Xanthophyllum
- Species: X. pauciflorum

Binomial name
- Xanthophyllum pauciflorum Meijden

Species of tree

Xanthophyllum pauciflorum is a tree in the family Polygalaceae. The specific epithet pauciflorum is from the Latin meaning 'few flowers', referring to the inflorescences.

== Description ==
Xanthophyllum pauciflorum grows up to 25 metres (80 ft) tall with a trunk diameter of up to 25 centimetres (10 in). The smooth bark is greyish. The flowers are yellowish, drying yellowish orange. The olive-brown fruits are round and measure up to 1.7 cm (1 in) in diameter.

== Distribution and habitat ==
Xanthophyllum pauciflorum is endemic to Borneo. Its habitat is mixed dipterocarp forest from 250 metres (800 ft) to 800 metres (3,000 ft) altitude.
