= Xanthophyllum ferrugineum =

Scientific classification
- Kingdom: Plantae
- Clade: Tracheophytes
- Clade: Angiosperms
- Clade: Eudicots
- Clade: Rosids
- Order: Fabales
- Family: Polygalaceae
- Genus: Xanthophyllum
- Species: X. ferrugineum

Binomial name
- Xanthophyllum ferrugineum Meijden

Species of tree

Xanthophyllum ferrugineum is a tree in the family Polygalaceae. The specific epithet ferrugineum is from the Latin meaning 'rust-coloured', referring to the inflorescences.

== Description ==
Xanthophyllum ferrugineum grows up to 25 metres (80 ft) tall with a trunk diameter of up to 60 centimetres (24 in). The smooth bark is grey or greenish. The flowers are yellow or white. The yellowish brown fruits are roundish and measure up to 2 cm (1 in) in diameter.

== Distribution and habitat ==
Xanthophyllum ferrugineum is endemic to Borneo. Its habitat is mixed dipterocarp forests from sea-level to 500 metres (1,600 ft) altitude.
