= Xanthophyllum heterophyllum =

Scientific classification
- Kingdom: Plantae
- Clade: Tracheophytes
- Clade: Angiosperms
- Clade: Eudicots
- Clade: Rosids
- Order: Fabales
- Family: Polygalaceae
- Genus: Xanthophyllum
- Species: X. heterophyllum

Binomial name
- Xanthophyllum heterophyllum Meijden

Species of tree

Xanthophyllum heterophyllum is a tree in the family Polygalaceae. The specific epithet heterophyllum is from the Greek meaning 'different leaf', referring to the leaf-like appearance of the axillary buds.

== Description ==
Xanthophyllum heterophyllum grows up to 30 metres (100 ft) tall with a trunk diameter of up to 50 centimetres (20 in). The smooth bark is greyish or yellowish. The brown fruits are round and measure up to 1.5 cm (1 in) in diameter.

== Distribution and habitat ==
Xanthophyllum heterophyllum is endemic to Borneo. Its habitat is lowland forests but can occur at up to 1,000 metres (3,300 ft) altitude.
