= Xanthophyllum bicolor =

Scientific classification
- Kingdom: Plantae
- Clade: Tracheophytes
- Clade: Angiosperms
- Clade: Eudicots
- Clade: Rosids
- Order: Fabales
- Family: Polygalaceae
- Genus: Xanthophyllum
- Species: X. bicolor

Binomial name
- Xanthophyllum bicolor W.J.de Wilde & Duyfjes

Species of tree

Xanthophyllum bicolor is a tree in the family Polygalaceae. The specific epithet bicolor is from the Latin meaning 'two-coloured', referring to the different colours of the leaf and petiole.

== Description ==
Xanthophyllum bicolor grows up to 30 metres (100 ft) tall with a trunk diameter of up to 32 centimetres (10 in). The bark is dark brown and smooth. The flowers are yellowish-orange, drying to brown-orange. The round fruits are blue turning light brown and measure up to 2 cm (1 in) in diameter.

== Distribution and habitat ==
Xanthophyllum bicolor is endemic to Borneo. Its habitat is mixed dipterocarp forests at low altitude.
