= Xanthophyllum lineare =

Conservation status
- Vulnerable (IUCN 3.1)

Scientific classification
- Kingdom: Plantae
- Clade: Tracheophytes
- Clade: Angiosperms
- Clade: Eudicots
- Clade: Rosids
- Order: Fabales
- Family: Polygalaceae
- Genus: Xanthophyllum
- Species: X. lineare

Binomial name
- Xanthophyllum lineare (Meijden) W.J.de Wilde & Duyfjes

Synonyms
- Xanthophyllum adenotus var. lineare Meijden

Species of tree

Xanthophyllum lineare is a tree in the family Polygalaceae. The specific epithet lineare is from the Latin meaning 'line', referring to the linear shape of the leaves.

== Description ==
Xanthophyllum lineare grows up to 7 metres (20 ft) tall with a trunk diameter of up to 9 centimetres (4 in). The smooth bark is brown or blackish. The flowers are pinkish or red. The light brown fruits are round and measure up to 1.8 cm (1 in) in diameter.

== Distribution and habitat ==
Xanthophyllum lineare is endemic to Borneo and known only from Sabah. Its habitat is stunted lowland rain forest growing on ultrabasic bedrock, from 200 metres (700 ft) to 800 metres (2,600 ft) elevation.
