= Xanthophyllum vitellinum =

Scientific classification
- Kingdom: Plantae
- Clade: Tracheophytes
- Clade: Angiosperms
- Clade: Eudicots
- Clade: Rosids
- Order: Fabales
- Family: Polygalaceae
- Genus: Xanthophyllum
- Species: X. vitellinum

Binomial name
- Xanthophyllum vitellinum (Blume) D.Dietr.

Synonyms
- Banisteroides vitellinum (Blume) Kuntze; Jakkia vitellina Blume; Monnina vitellina (Blume) Spreng.

Species of flowering plant

Xanthophyllum vitellinum is a plant in the family Polygalaceae. The specific epithet vitellinum is from the Latin meaning 'egg-yolk yellow', referring to the colour of the flower petals.

== Description ==
Xanthophyllum vitellinum grows as a shrub or tree up to 25 metres (80 ft) tall with a trunk diameter of up to 40 centimetres (20 in). The smooth bark is whitish or greyish brown. The flowers are yellow or white, drying orange to dark reddish. The brown-green fruits are round and measure up to 1.8 cm (1 in) in diameter.

== Distribution and habitat ==
Xanthophyllum vitellinum grows naturally in Thailand and western Malesia. Its habitat is mixed dipterocarp, riverine or lower montane forests from sea-level to 800 metres (2,600 ft) altitude.
