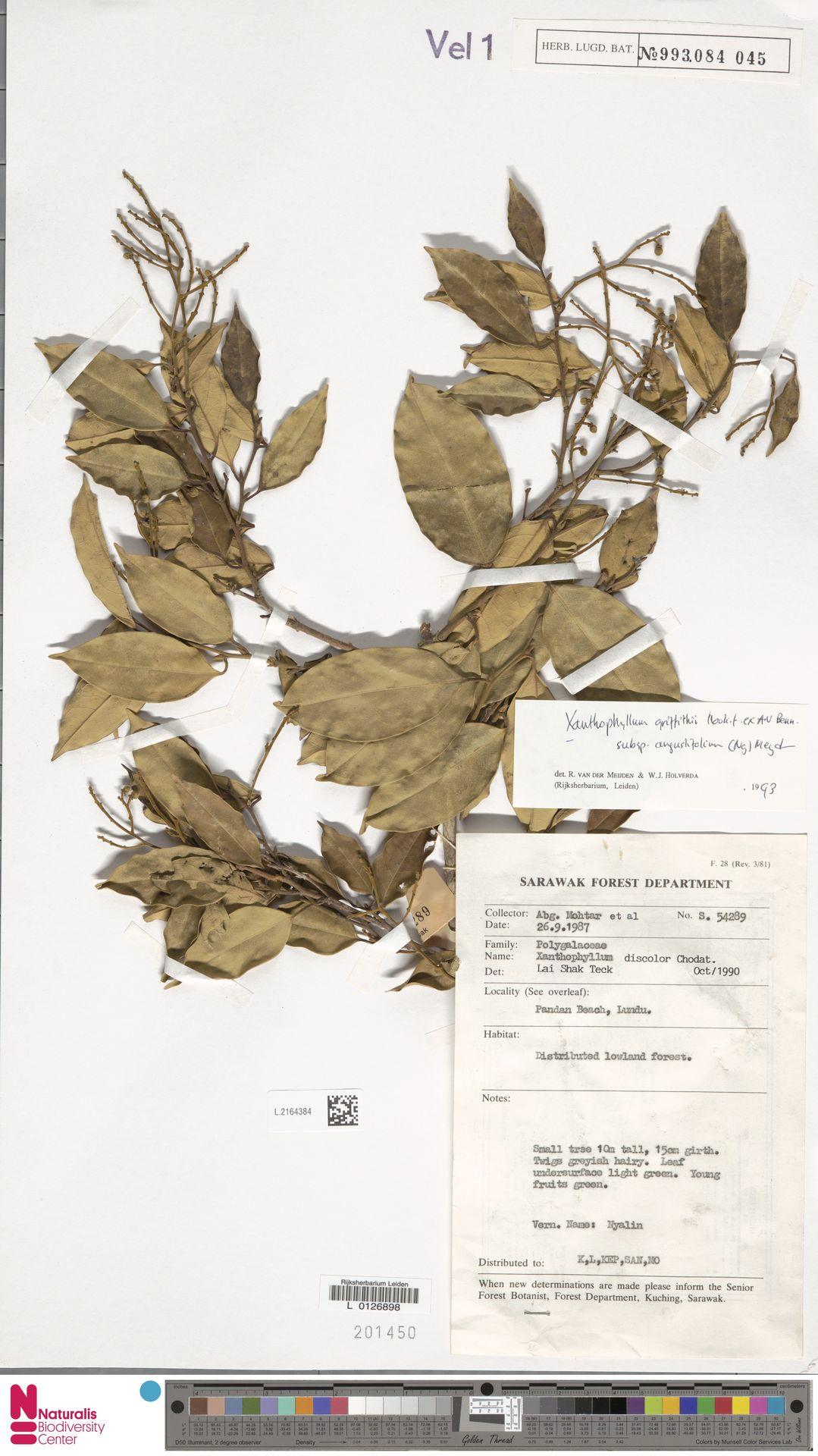
- A dried specimen of xanthophyllum griffithi.

Scientific classification
- Kingdom: Plantae
- Clade: Tracheophytes
- Clade: Angiosperms
- Clade: Eudicots
- Clade: Rosids
- Order: Fabales
- Family: Polygalaceae
- Genus: Xanthophyllum
- Species: X. griffithii

Binomial name
- Xanthophyllum griffithii Hook.f. ex A.W.Benn.

Synonyms
- Banisterodes griffithii (Hook.f. ex A.W.Benn.) Kuntze

= Xanthophyllum griffithii =

Species of tree

Xanthophyllum griffithii is a tree in the family Polygalaceae. It is named for the British botanist William Griffith.

== Description ==
Xanthophyllum griffithii grows up to 27 metres (90 ft) tall, with a trunk diameter of up to 40 cm (16 in). The smooth bark is brown to grey. The leaves are ovate to elliptic and measure up to 10 cm (4 in) long. The branched inflorescences feature white flowers. The roundish fruits are brown.

== Distribution and habitat ==
Xanthophyllum griffithii is native to an area from Myanmar in the west to the Philippines in the east and south to Java. Its habitat is dipterocarp and kerangas forests on hills and in lowlands, including by rivers and by the sea, to elevations of about 1,400 m (4,600 ft).

== Varieties and subspecies ==
The following varieties and subspecies are recognised:

- Xanthophyllum griffithii var. angustifolium Ng – Borneo, Java, Laos, Peninsular Malaysia, the Philippines, Sumatra, Thailand
- Xanthophyllum griffithii subsp. erectum Meijden – Peninsular Malaysia
- Xanthophyllum griffithii subsp. griffithii – Myanmar
- Xanthophyllum griffithii var. papillosum W.J.de Wilde & Duyfjes – Borneo
