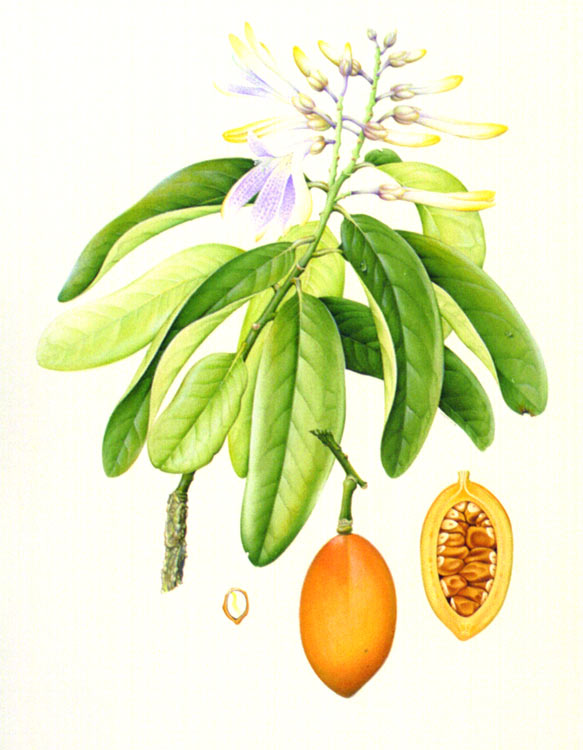

Conservation status
- Near Threatened (NCA)

Scientific classification
- Kingdom: Plantae
- Clade: Tracheophytes
- Clade: Angiosperms
- Clade: Eudicots
- Clade: Rosids
- Order: Fabales
- Family: Polygalaceae
- Genus: Xanthophyllum
- Species: X. fragrans

Binomial name
- Xanthophyllum fragrans C.T. White

= Xanthophyllum fragrans =

Fragrant boxwood

Species of flowering plant

Xanthophyllum fragrans, commonly known as fragrant boxwood, is an evergreen plant in the family Polygalaceae found only in the Wet Tropics bioregion of Queensland, Australia.

== Description ==
Xanthophyllum fragrans is a tree growing up to about 20 m (66 ft) tall, and it may produce buttress roots. The leaves are simple, arranged alternately and attached to the twigs by petioles about 10 mm (0.39 in) long; they are glossy dark green above and paler green below, and measure up to 20 cm (7.9 in) long by 7 cm (2.8 in) wide.

The inflorescences are produced either terminally or in the leaf axils, and they take the form of a raceme about 12 cm (4.7 in) long. The flowers are very fragrant and quite large with five cream to yellow petals up to 7 cm (2.8 in) long and 1 cm (0.39 in) wide. The stamens are about 55 mm (2.2 in) long with anthers about 3 mm (0.12 in) long; the style is about 40 mm (1.6 in) long, the stigma is capitate (i.e. like the head of a pin).

The orange fruit is (in botanical terms) a berry measuring about 9 cm (3.5 in) long and 4.5 cm (1.8 in) wide. They contain 8 or more seeds measuring about 15 mm (0.59 in) by 12 mm (0.47 in), which are completely enclosed in a cream aril.

=== Phenology ===
Flowering occurs from September to October, and fruit ripen in December and January.

== Taxonomy ==
This species was first described by the Australian botanist Cyril Tenison White in his paper titled Contributions to the Queensland Flora, No. 6, which was read to the Royal Society of Queensland in November 1938. It was subsequently published in the Society's journal Proceedings of the Royal Society of Queensland in 1939.

== Distribution and habitat ==
Xanthophyllum fragrans has a restricted distribution within Queensland's Wet Tropics World Heritage Area, from near Cape Tribulation to the Kuranda National Park. It grows in well developed rainforest at altitudes from near sea level up to 1,000 m (3,300 ft).

It has a total Area of Occupancy (Note: For a definition of Area of Occupancy see this page at the Atlas of Living Australia) of just 120 km^{2} (46 sq mi).

== Conservation ==
This species is listed by the Queensland Government's Department of Environment, Science and Innovation as near threatened. As of 15 April 2024, it has not been assessed by the International Union for Conservation of Nature (IUCN).

== Cultivation ==
This species is too large for the average suburban garden but it has potential as an attractive park tree due to its large fragrant flowers and colourful fruit.

== Gallery ==
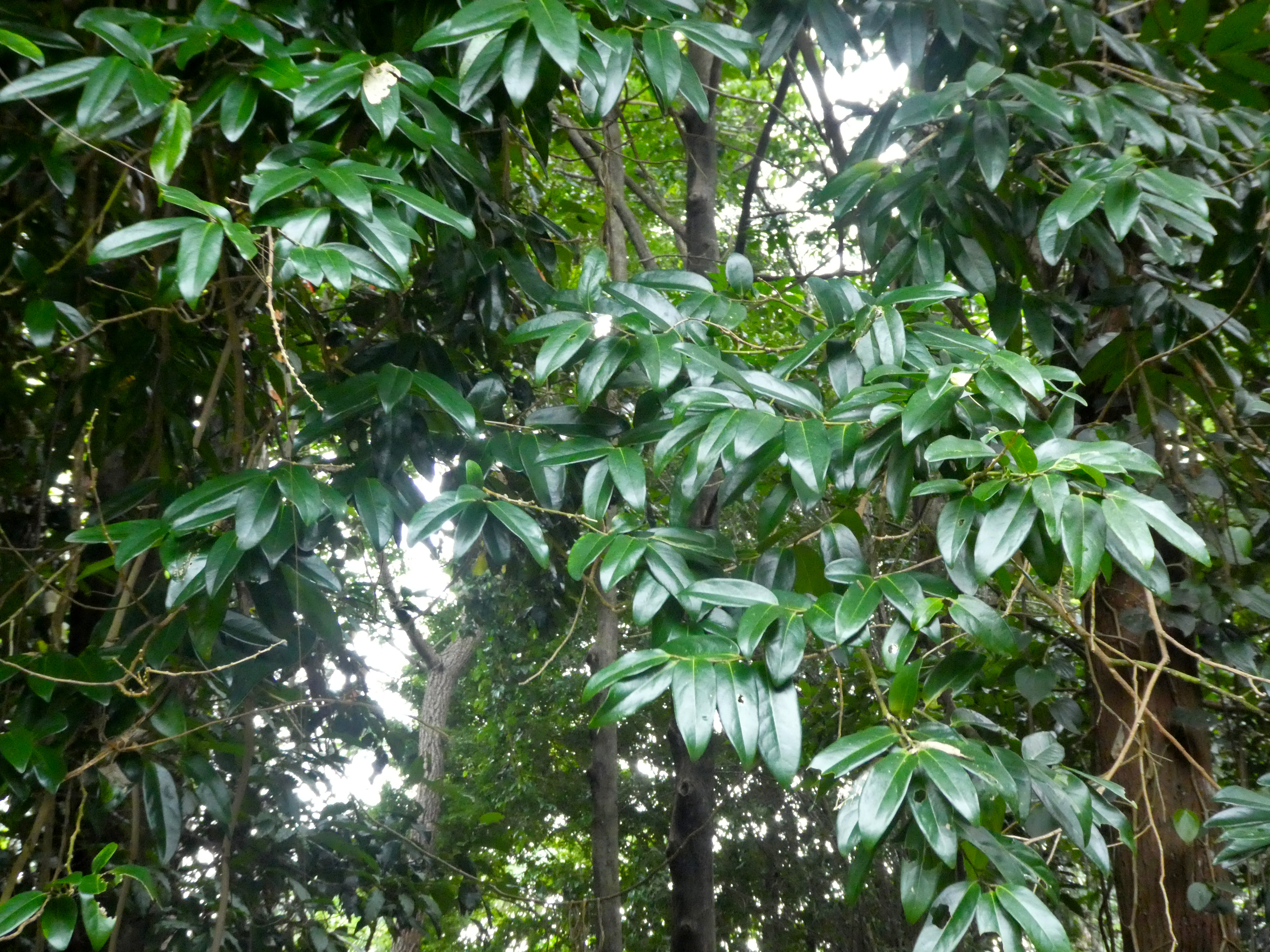
Foliage and habit

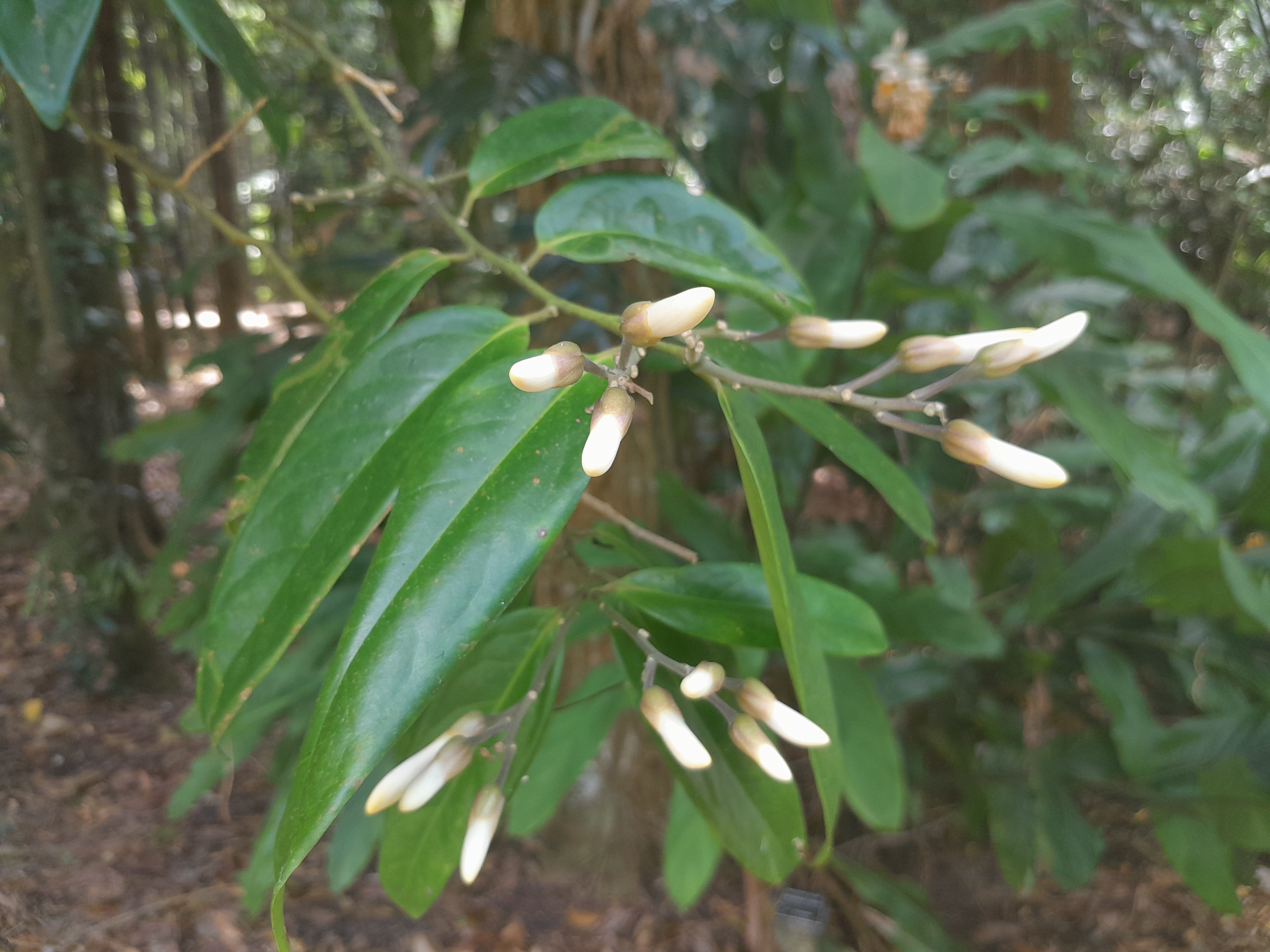
Flower buds

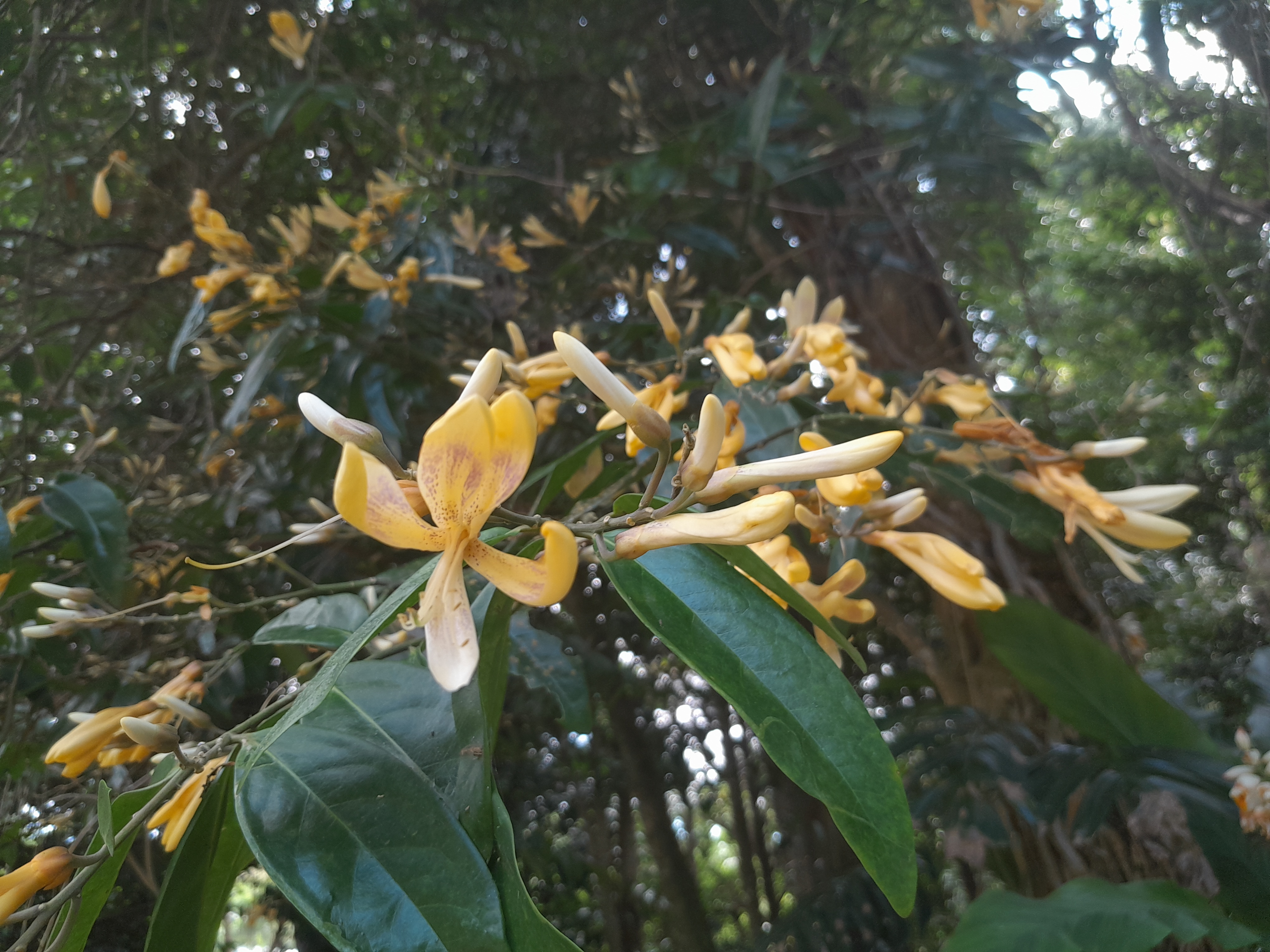
Flowering

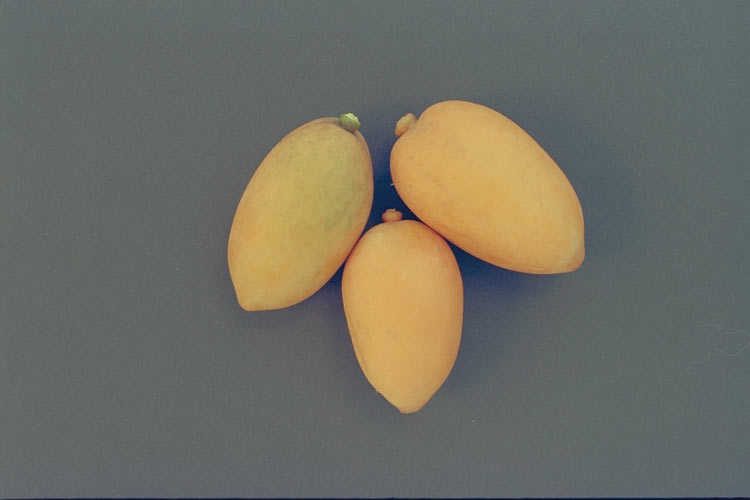
Mature fruit

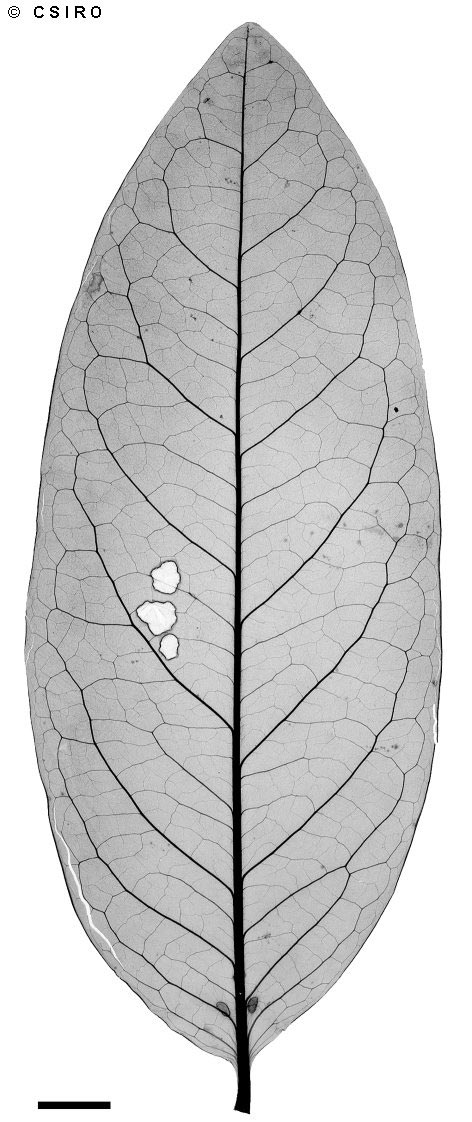
Leaf x-ray
