= Xanthophyllum stipitatum =

Scientific classification
- Kingdom: Plantae
- Clade: Tracheophytes
- Clade: Angiosperms
- Clade: Eudicots
- Clade: Rosids
- Order: Fabales
- Family: Polygalaceae
- Genus: Xanthophyllum
- Species: X. stipitatum

Binomial name
- Xanthophyllum stipitatum A.W.Benn.

Synonyms
- Banisteroides stipitatum (A.W.Benn.) Kuntze

Species of plant in the milkwort family

Xanthophyllum stipitatum is a plant in the family Polygalaceae. The specific epithet stipitatum is from the Latin meaning 'stalked', referring to the ovary of the flower.

== Description ==
Xanthophyllum stipitatum grows as a shrub (rarely) or tree up to 50 metres (160 ft) tall with a trunk diameter of up to 80 centimetres (30 in). The smooth bark is grey or pale brown. The flowers are white, drying black. The edible, round fruits are black, ripening to yellow or orange, and measure up to 6 cm (2 in) (or more) in diameter.

== Distribution and habitat ==
Xanthophyllum stipitatum grows naturally in Sumatra, Peninsular Malaysia and Borneo. Its habitat is hill, riverine or peatswamp forests (occasionally kerangas forest) from sea-level to 1,500 metres (5,000 ft) altitude.
