= Xanthophyllum brachystachyum =

Scientific classification
- Kingdom: Plantae
- Clade: Tracheophytes
- Clade: Angiosperms
- Clade: Eudicots
- Clade: Rosids
- Order: Fabales
- Family: Polygalaceae
- Genus: Xanthophyllum
- Species: X. brachystachyum

Binomial name
- Xanthophyllum brachystachyum W.J.de Wilde & Duyfjes

Species of tree

Xanthophyllum brachystachyum is a tree in the family Polygalaceae. The specific epithet brachystachyum is from the Greek meaning 'short spike', referring to the shortness of the inflorescence.

== Description ==
Xanthophyllum brachystachyum grows up to 12 metres (40 ft) tall with a trunk diameter of up to 9 centimetres (4 in). The smooth bark is grey-green or whitish. The flowers are purplish, drying orange-brown. The pale brown fruits are round and measure up to 1.5 cm (1 in) in diameter.

== Distribution and habitat ==
Xanthophyllum brachystachyum is endemic to Borneo. Its habitat is mixed dipterocarp forests from 500 metres (1,600 ft) to 900 metres (3,000 ft) altitude.
