= Xanthophyllum pedicellatum =

Scientific classification
- Kingdom: Plantae
- Clade: Tracheophytes
- Clade: Angiosperms
- Clade: Eudicots
- Clade: Rosids
- Order: Fabales
- Family: Polygalaceae
- Genus: Xanthophyllum
- Species: X. pedicellatum

Binomial name
- Xanthophyllum pedicellatum Meijden

Species of flowering plant

Xanthophyllum pedicellatum is a plant in the family Polygalaceae. The specific epithet pedicellatum is from the Latin, referring to the long pedicel (flower stem).

== Description ==
Xanthophyllum pedicellatum grows as a shrub or tree up to 20 metres (70 ft) tall with a trunk diameter of up to 20 centimetres (10 in). The smooth bark is greyish or greenish. The flowers are pinkish, drying orange-red. The pale brownish fruits are round and measure up to 2 cm (1 in) in diameter.

== Distribution and habitat ==
Xanthophyllum pedicellatum is endemic to Borneo. Its habitat is lowland forest and swampy terrain from sea-level to 500 metres (1,600 ft) altitude.
