= Xanthophyllum ceraceifolium =

Conservation status
- Critically Endangered (IUCN 3.1)

Scientific classification
- Kingdom: Plantae
- Clade: Tracheophytes
- Clade: Angiosperms
- Clade: Eudicots
- Clade: Rosids
- Order: Fabales
- Family: Polygalaceae
- Genus: Xanthophyllum
- Species: X. ceraceifolium

Binomial name
- Xanthophyllum ceraceifolium Meijden

Species of tree

Xanthophyllum ceraceifolium is a tree in the family Polygalaceae. The specific epithet ceraceifolium means 'waxy leaf', referring to the appearance of the leaves.

== Description ==
Xanthophyllum ceraceifolium grows up to 16 metres (50 ft) tall with a trunk diameter of up to 16 centimetres (6 in). The bark is greyish brown. The flowers are yellowish, drying to dark red.

== Distribution and habitat ==
Xanthophyllum ceraceifolium is endemic to Borneo. It is confined to Semengoh Nature Reserve in Sarawak and the population size is estimated at less than 200 trees. Its habitat is lowland mixed dipterocarp forests at altitudes of 50–100 metres (200–300 ft).
