= Xanthophyllum tardicrescens =

Scientific classification
- Kingdom: Plantae
- Clade: Tracheophytes
- Clade: Angiosperms
- Clade: Eudicots
- Clade: Rosids
- Order: Fabales
- Family: Polygalaceae
- Genus: Xanthophyllum
- Species: X. tardicrescens

Binomial name
- Xanthophyllum tardicrescens Meijden

Species of tree

Xanthophyllum tardicrescens is a tree in the family Polygalaceae. The specific epithet tardicrescens is from the Latin meaning 'slowly growing', referring to the twigs.

== Description ==
Xanthophyllum tardicrescens grows up to 6 metres (20 ft) tall with a trunk diameter of up to 6 centimetres (2 in). The flowers are white, drying yellowish orange. The round fruits are yellowish green.

== Distribution and habitat ==
Xanthophyllum tardicrescens is endemic to Borneo. Its habitat is mixed dipterocarp forest.
