= Xanthophyllum ramiflorum =

Scientific classification
- Kingdom: Plantae
- Clade: Tracheophytes
- Clade: Angiosperms
- Clade: Eudicots
- Clade: Rosids
- Order: Fabales
- Family: Polygalaceae
- Genus: Xanthophyllum
- Species: X. ramiflorum

Binomial name
- Xanthophyllum ramiflorum Meijden

Species of flowering plant

Xanthophyllum ramiflorum is a plant in the family Polygalaceae. The specific epithet ramiflorum is from the Latin meaning 'flowering on the branches'.

== Description ==
Xanthophyllum ramiflorum grows as a shrub or tree up to 30 metres (100 ft) tall with a trunk diameter of up to 40 centimetres (16 in). The bark is pale brown. The flowers are white, drying yellowish. The roundish fruits are reddish brown and measure up to 1.2 cm (0.5 in) in diameter.

== Distribution and habitat ==
Xanthophyllum ramiflorum is endemic to Borneo. Its habitat is peatswamp and kerangas forests.
