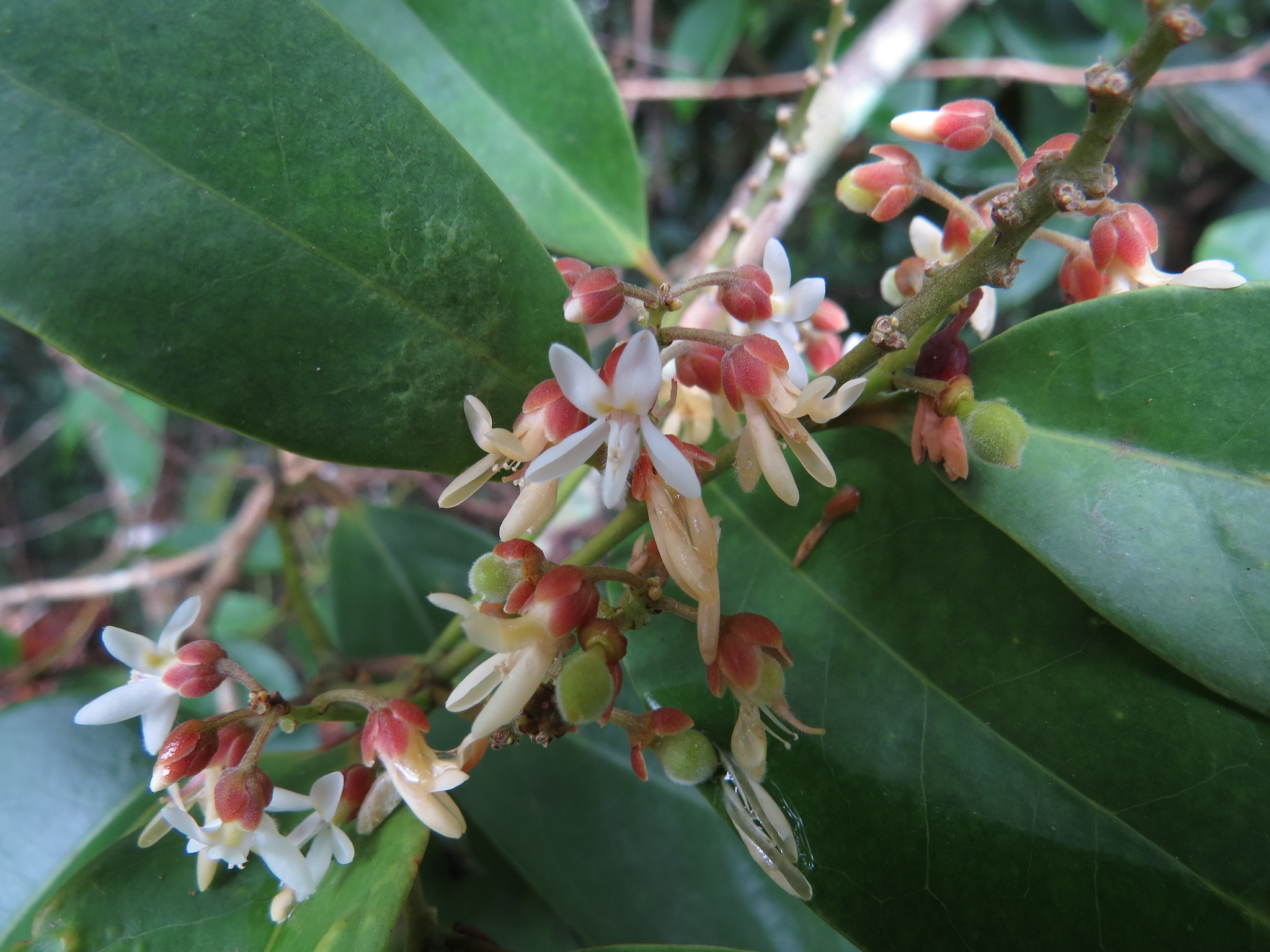
- Flowers seen in Edmonton, Queensland, Jan 2013

Conservation status
- Least Concern (NCA)
- Least Concern (IUCN 3.1)

Scientific classification
- Kingdom: Plantae
- Clade: Tracheophytes
- Clade: Angiosperms
- Clade: Eudicots
- Clade: Rosids
- Order: Fabales
- Family: Polygalaceae
- Genus: Xanthophyllum
- Species: X. octandrum

Binomial name
- Xanthophyllum octandrum (F.Muell.) Karel Domin
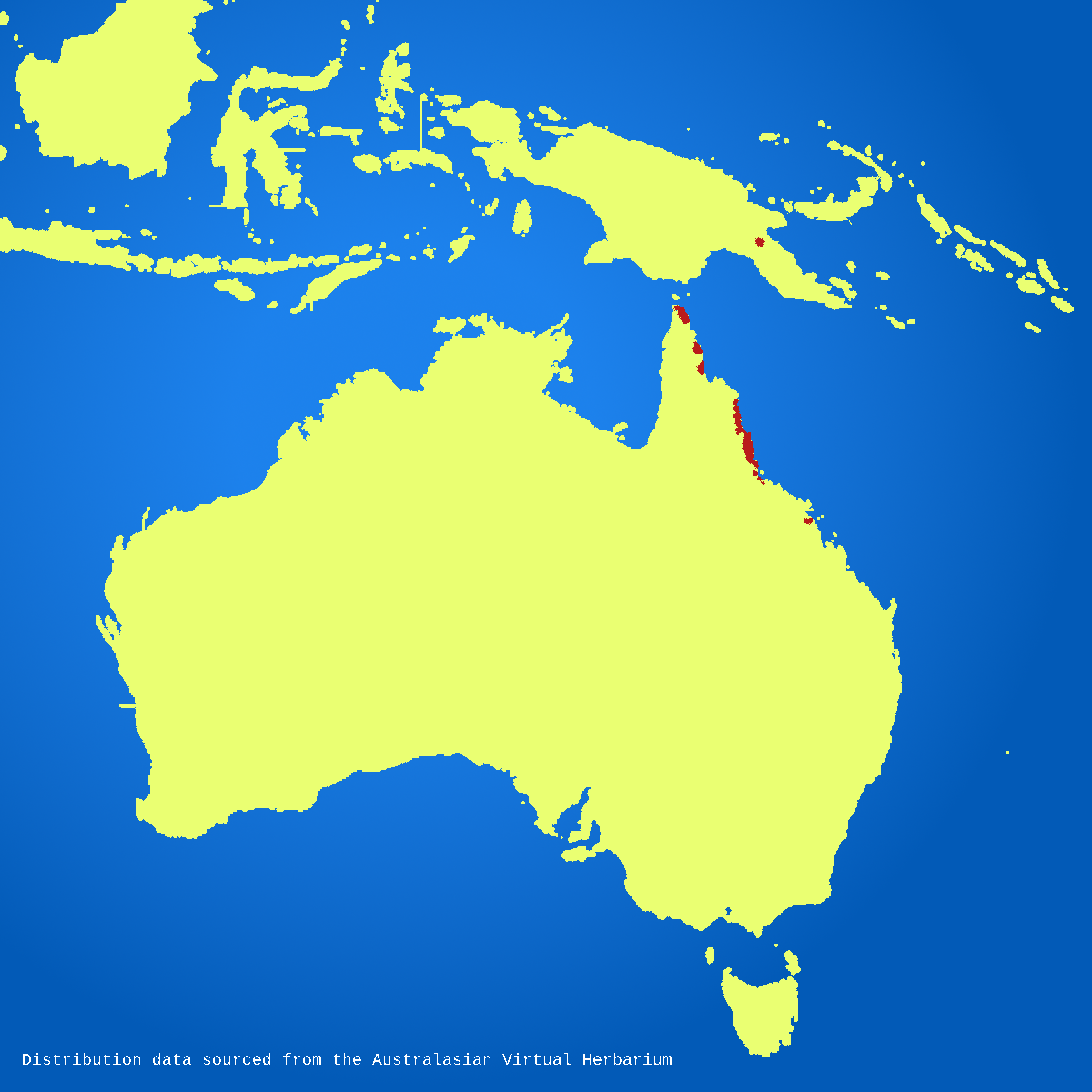

Synonyms
- Macintyria octandra F.Muell.; Xanthophyllum macintyrii F.Muell. (nom. illeg.); Banisterodes macintyrii (F.Muell.) Kuntze

= Xanthophyllum octandrum =

Macintyre's boxwood

Species of flowering plant

Xanthophyllum octandrum, commonly known as Macintyre's boxwood, false jitta, yellow boxwood or sovereignwood, is a slow-growing tree in the milkwort family Polygalaceae which has the potential to reach thousands of years of age. It is endemic to coastal northeastern Queensland, Australia.

== Description ==
Macintyre's boxwood is a large rainforest tree growing up to 30 m (98 ft) in height, with a sparse crown and no buttress roots. The leaves are ovate to elliptic and measure up to 22 cm (8.7 in) by 6 cm (2.4 in). The inflorescence is a raceme up to 20 cm (7.9 in) long with fragrant zygomorphic flowers on pedicels about 4 mm (0.16 in) long. The globular orange fruits are 18 to 23 mm (0.71 to 0.91 in) diameter. The fruit splits along irregular lines to reveal a single seed which is completely enclosed in a black aril.

This species is very slow growing and the largest trees in its range are believed to be of great age. One specimen has been radiocarbon dated at 3,500 years old.

== Taxonomy ==
This species was first described in 1865 by the German-born Australian botanist Ferdinand von Mueller as Macintyria octandra. Mueller's description was based on specimens collected by John Dallachy at Rockingham Bay in Queensland, and was published in volume 5 of his work Fragmenta phytographiæ Australiæ. Apparently through oversight, Mueller published a second description shortly afterwards in the same year, this time giving it the combination Xanthophyllum macintyrii. The latter is an illegitimate name because it was based on the same type material.

In 1927 the Czech botanist Karel Domin published a new description in Bibliotheca Botanica, giving the species its current binomial combination.

=== Etymology ===
The genus name Xanthophyllum is a combination of the Ancient Greek words xanthós, "yellow", and fýllo, "leaf", a reference to the colour of aging leaves. The species epithet octandrum is from octo, "eight", and andro, "male". This refers to the eight stamens in the flower.

== Distribution and habitat ==
Macintyre's boxwood grows in well developed rainforest on various soils (but is more common on those derived from grantite), and is found at altitudes from sea level up to 1,600 m (5,200 ft).

Treatments of this species in both Flora of Australia and Australian Tropical Rainforest Plants state that it is endemic to Queensland. However the Australasian Virtual Herbarium has records of three sightings of the species in a single location in Papua New Guinea, more than 600 km (370 mi) to the northeast of the nearest sighting in Australia.

In Australia it occurs in a number of disjunct populations. The Australasian Virtual Herbarium has records in the following areas (listed from north to south): the tip of Cape York, both close to and within the Apudthama (formerly Jardine River) National Park; in the vicinity of Kutini-Payamu (Iron Range) National Park; a small cluster of sightings near Coen; the largest area with the majority of official sightings, from Cooktown to Lucinda, including the Atherton Tablelands; a cluster in the Paluma Range National Park; two occurrences on Mount Elliot; and the southernmost grouping at Eungella National Park, near Mackay.

== Ecology ==
Fruits of Macintyre's boxwood are eaten by cassowaries (Casuarius casuarius), Sulphur-crested cockatoos (Cacatua galerita), Metallic starlings (Aplonis metallica) and Golden bowerbirds (Prionodura newtoniana). The leaves are eaten by Lumholtz's tree-kangaroos (Dendrolagus lumholtzi).

== Conservation ==
As of 2 January 2023 this species is listed as least concern by both the Queensland Department of Environment and Science and the IUCN.

The IUCN cites a wide distribution and no identified current or future threats as the justification for their assessment. It was last assessed by the group on 12 June 2018.

== Uses ==
Extracts of the bark of Xanthophyllum octandrum have shown strong cytotoxic activity, and thus a potential use in pharmacology.

== Gallery ==
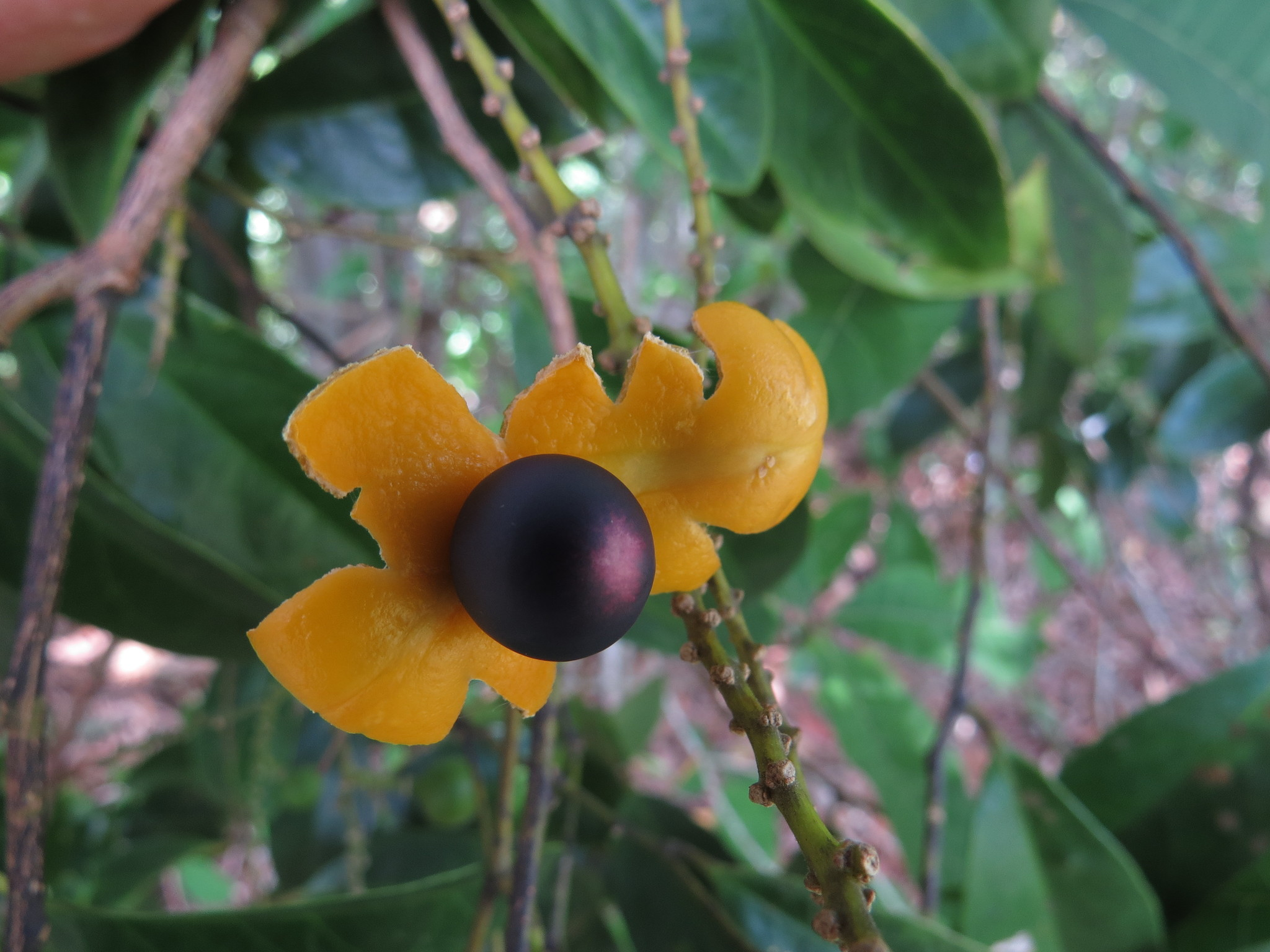
Fruit after dehiscence

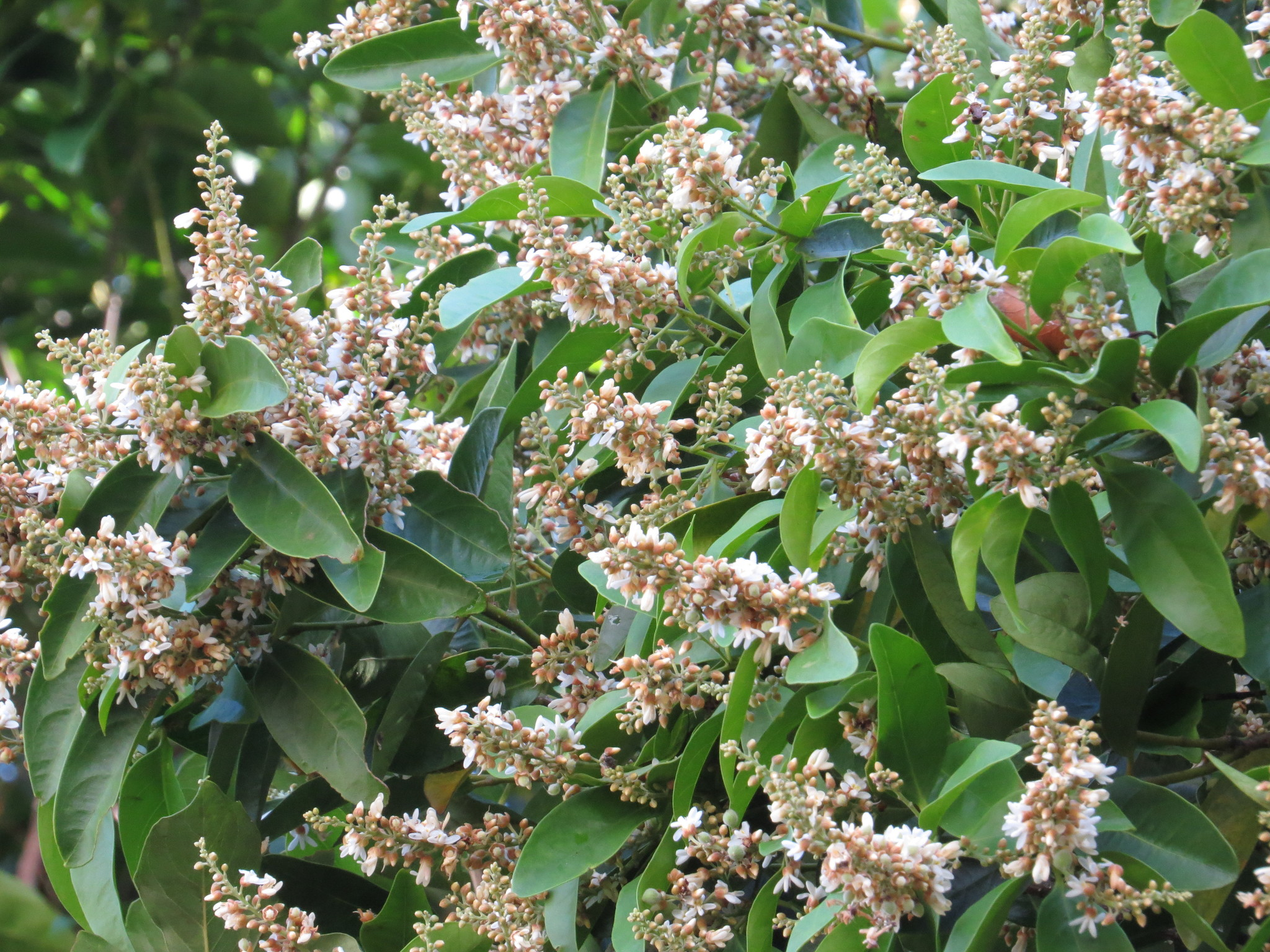
Large inflorescence photographed in Cairns, Queensland
