= Xanthophyllum macrophyllum =

Scientific classification
- Kingdom: Plantae
- Clade: Tracheophytes
- Clade: Angiosperms
- Clade: Eudicots
- Clade: Rosids
- Order: Fabales
- Family: Polygalaceae
- Genus: Xanthophyllum
- Species: X. macrophyllum

Binomial name
- Xanthophyllum macrophyllum Baker

Species of flowering plant

Xanthophyllum macrophyllum is a plant in the family Polygalaceae. The specific epithet macrophyllum is from the Greek meaning 'large leaf'.

== Description ==
Xanthophyllum macrophyllum grows as a shrub or tree up to 25 metres (80 ft) tall with a trunk diameter of up to 30 centimetres (12 in). The smooth bark is pale brown. The flowers are yellow or white, drying brown or blackish. The round fruits are yellow-brown or blackish and measure up to 2 cm (1 in) in diameter.

== Distribution and habitat ==
Xanthophyllum macrophyllum is endemic to Borneo. Its habitat is lowland mixed dipterocarp forests or lower montane forests from sea-level to 1,750 metres (5,700 ft) altitude.
