= Xanthophyllum contractum =

Scientific classification
- Kingdom: Plantae
- Clade: Tracheophytes
- Clade: Angiosperms
- Clade: Eudicots
- Clade: Rosids
- Order: Fabales
- Family: Polygalaceae
- Genus: Xanthophyllum
- Species: X. contractum

Binomial name
- Xanthophyllum contractum Meijden

Species of tree

Xanthophyllum contractum is a tree in the family Polygalaceae. The specific epithet contractum is from the Latin meaning 'contracted', referring to short inflorescences and short fruit stalks.

== Description ==
Xanthophyllum contractum grows up to 18 metres (60 ft) tall with a trunk diameter of up to 30 centimetres (12 in). The twigs are smooth and pale yellowish. The dark reddish fruits are ovoid and measure up to 2 cm (1 in) in diameter.

== Distribution and habitat ==
Xanthophyllum contractum is endemic to Borneo. Its habitat is lowland riparian forests.
