= Xanthophyllum nigricans =

Scientific classification
- Kingdom: Plantae
- Clade: Tracheophytes
- Clade: Angiosperms
- Clade: Eudicots
- Clade: Rosids
- Order: Fabales
- Family: Polygalaceae
- Genus: Xanthophyllum
- Species: X. nigricans

Binomial name
- Xanthophyllum nigricans Meijden

Species of tree

Xanthophyllum nigricans is a tree in the family Polygalaceae. The specific epithet nigricans is from the Latin meaning 'blackish', referring to the drying of plant parts.

== Description ==
Xanthophyllum nigricans grows up to 25 metres (80 ft) tall with a trunk diameter of up to 20 centimetres (10 in). The smooth bark is greyish or dark brown. The flowers are white, drying dark reddish. The brownish fruits are round and measure up to 1.4 cm (1 in) in diameter.

== Distribution and habitat ==
Xanthophyllum nigricans is endemic to Borneo. Its habitat is ridge and hillside forests from sea-level to 600 metres (2,000 ft) altitude.
