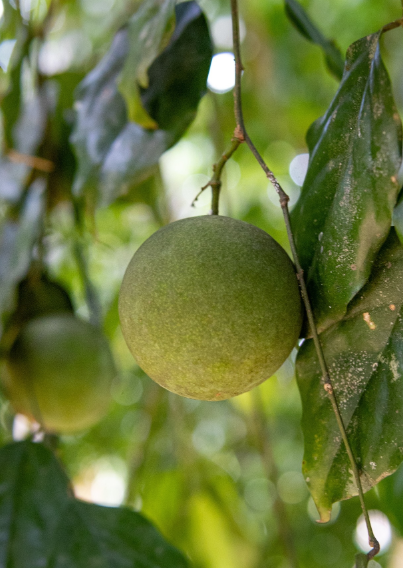

Scientific classification
- Kingdom: Plantae
- Clade: Embryophytes
- Clade: Tracheophytes
- Clade: Spermatophytes
- Clade: Angiosperms
- Clade: Eudicots
- Clade: Rosids
- Order: Fabales
- Family: Polygalaceae
- Genus: Xanthophyllum
- Species: X. amoenum

Binomial name
- Xanthophyllum amoenum Chodat

= Xanthophyllum amoenum =

Species of plant

Xanthophyllum amoenum is a plant species in the family Polygalaceae. Common names include langgir or shampoo fruit.

== Description ==
Xanthophyllum amoenum is a fruit-bearing tree that can grow up to 35 m (115 ft) tall. The beige-colored and round fruits are around 7 cm (2.8 in) large, having a thick rind and a sweet white flesh.

== Distribution and habitat ==
Xanthophyllum amoenum is native to Southeast Asia and grows in Indonesia. They tend to grow in swamps or dipterocarp secondary forests.
