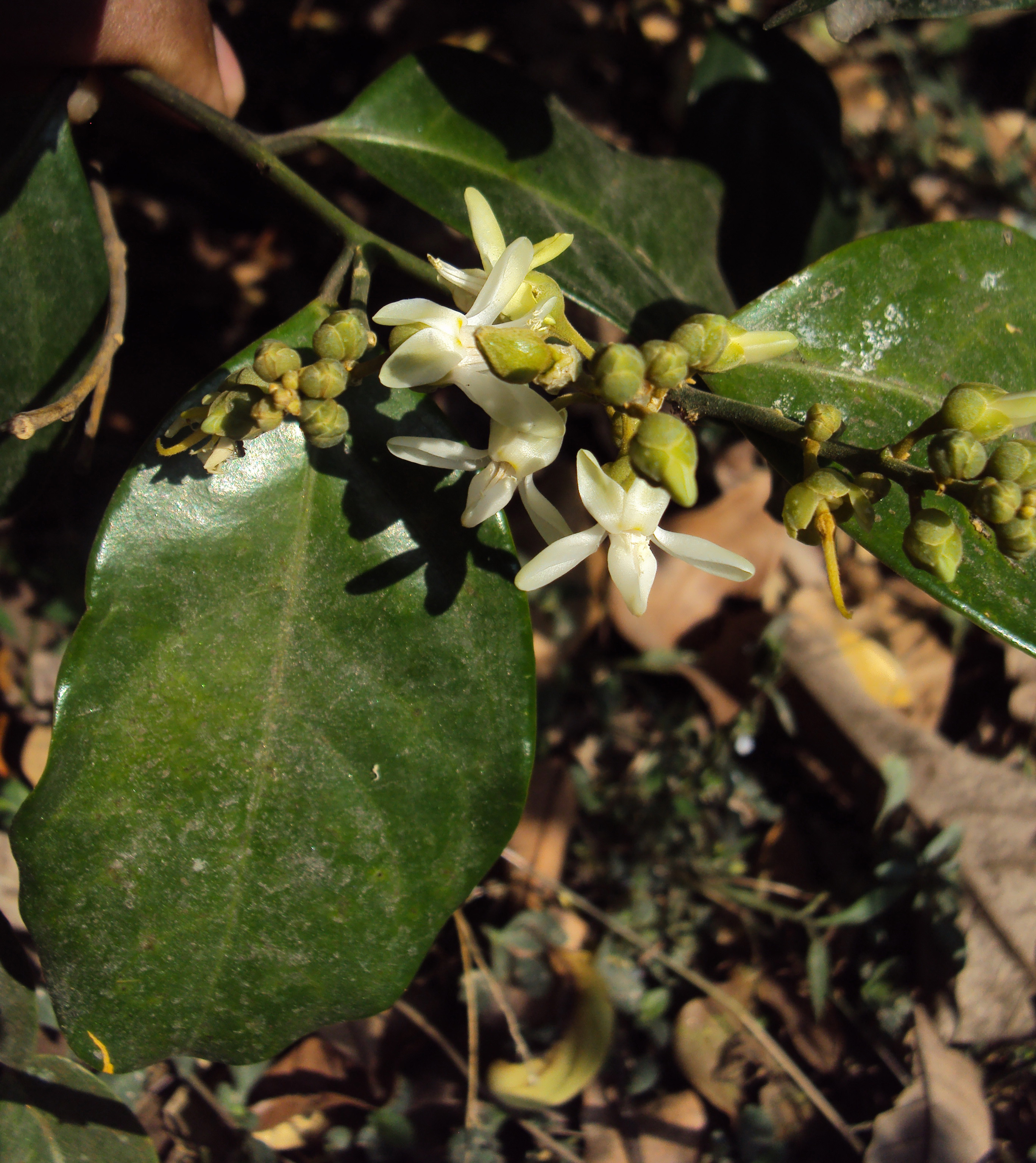
- Xanthophyllum flavescens, India

Scientific classification
- Kingdom: Plantae
- Clade: Embryophytes
- Clade: Tracheophytes
- Clade: Spermatophytes
- Clade: Angiosperms
- Clade: Eudicots
- Clade: Rosids
- Order: Fabales
- Family: Polygalaceae
- Tribe: Xanthophylleae; Chodat
- Genus: Xanthophyllum; Roxb.

Species
- See text

Synonyms
- Banisterodes Kuntze; Eystathes Lour.; Jakkia Blume; KaulfussiaDennst.; Macintyria F.Muell.; Pelae Adans.; Skaphium Miq.

= Xanthophyllum =

Genus of trees and shrubs

Xanthophyllum is a genus of about 109 species of trees and shrubs, of the plant family Polygalaceae; (under the Cronquist system it was previously placed in the monotypic family Xanthophyllaceae). The generic name is from the Greek meaning "yellow leaf", referring to how the leaves are often yellow when dry. In Borneo it is known as minyak berok in Malay or nyalin in the Iban language.

== Description ==
Xanthophyllum species grow as trees or shrubs. Their twigs are often smooth and are coloured green or yellow. Leaves, when not drying yellow, dry green or dark brown. Flowers feature five petals. The mostly roundish fruits are not winged and measure up to 15 cm (6 in) in diameter. Fruits of some species are considered edible, e.g. X. ecarinatum, X. obscurum and X. stipitatum.

== Distribution and habitat ==
Xanthophyllum grows naturally from India in tropical Asia to northern Australia. The majority of species grow in lowland rainforest. Some species grow at higher altitudes in hill or montane forests. Others occur in peatswamp or kerangas forests.

== Species ==
As of February 2021, the following is a list of accepted species:

- Xanthophyllum adenotus Miq.
- Xanthophyllum albicaule W.J.de Wilde & Duyfjes
- Xanthophyllum amoenum Chodat
- Xanthophyllum ancolanum Miq.
- Xanthophyllum andamanicum King
- Xanthophyllum angustigemma Meijden
- Xanthophyllum annamense Gagnep.
- Xanthophyllum beccarianum Chodat
- Xanthophyllum bibracteatum Gagnep.
- Xanthophyllum bicolor W.J.de Wilde & Duyfjes
- Xanthophyllum bombayanum Chodat
- Xanthophyllum borneense Miq.
- Xanthophyllum brachystachyum W.J.de Wilde & Duyfjes
- Xanthophyllum bracteatum Chodat
- Xanthophyllum brevipes Meijden
- Xanthophyllum brigittae Meijden
- Xanthophyllum bullatum King
- Xanthophyllum burkillii J.R.Drumm. & Dunn
- Xanthophyllum celebicum Meijden
- Xanthophyllum ceraceifolium Meijden
- Xanthophyllum chartaceum Meijden
- Xanthophyllum clovis (Steenis ex Meijden) Meijden
- Xanthophyllum cochinchinense Meijden
- Xanthophyllum cockburnii Meijden
- Xanthophyllum colubrinum Gagnep.
- Xanthophyllum contractum Meijden
- Xanthophyllum crassum W.J.de Wilde & Duyfjes
- Xanthophyllum cucullatum Meijden
- Xanthophyllum discolor Chodat
- Xanthophyllum eberhardtii Gagnep.
- Xanthophyllum ecarinatum Chodat
- Xanthophyllum eglandulosum Griff.
- Xanthophyllum ellipticum Korth. ex Miq.
- Xanthophyllum erythrostachyum Gagnep.
- Xanthophyllum eurhynchum Miq.
- Xanthophyllum excelsum (Blume) Blume ex Miq.
- Xanthophyllum ferrugineum Meijden
- Xanthophyllum flavescens Roxb.
- Xanthophyllum fragrans C.T.White
- Xanthophyllum geesinkii Meijden
- Xanthophyllum geminatum Meijden
- Xanthophyllum griffithii Hook.f. ex A.W.Benn.
- Xanthophyllum hainanense Hu
- Xanthophyllum havilandii Chodat
- Xanthophyllum heterophyllum Meijden
- Xanthophyllum impressum Meijden
- Xanthophyllum incertum (Blume) Meijden
- Xanthophyllum inflatum W.J.de Wilde & Duyfjes
- Xanthophyllum ionanthum W.J.de Wilde & Duyfjes
- Xanthophyllum korthalsianum Miq.
- Xanthophyllum laeve Meijden
- Xanthophyllum lanceatum (Miq.) J.J.Sm.
- Xanthophyllum lateriflorum Miq.
- Xanthophyllum lineare (Meijden) W.J.de Wilde & Duyfjes
- Xanthophyllum longum W.J.de Wilde & Duyfjes
- Xanthophyllum macrophyllum Baker
- Xanthophyllum malayanum Meijden
- Xanthophyllum manickamii Murugan
- Xanthophyllum montanum Meijden
- Xanthophyllum monticola Meijden
- Xanthophyllum neglectum Meijden
- Xanthophyllum ngii Meijden
- Xanthophyllum nigricans Meijden
- Xanthophyllum nitidum W.J.de Wilde & Duyfjes
- Xanthophyllum novoguinense Meijden
- Xanthophyllum obscurum A.W.Benn.
- Xanthophyllum octandrum (F.Muell.) Domin
- Xanthophyllum oliganthum C.Y.Wu
- Xanthophyllum ovatifolium Chodat
- Xanthophyllum pachycarpon W.J.de Wilde & Duyfjes
- Xanthophyllum palawanense Elmer
- Xanthophyllum papuanum Whitmore ex Meijden
- Xanthophyllum parvifolium Meijden
- Xanthophyllum pauciflorum Meijden
- Xanthophyllum pedicellatum Meijden
- Xanthophyllum penibukanense Heine
- Xanthophyllum petiolatum Meijden
- Xanthophyllum philippinense Chodat
- Xanthophyllum poilanei Meijden
- Xanthophyllum pseudoadenotus Meijden
- Xanthophyllum pubescens Meijden
- Xanthophyllum pulchrum King
- Xanthophyllum punctatum Meijden
- Xanthophyllum purpureum Ridl.
- Xanthophyllum ramiflorum Meijden
- Xanthophyllum rectum W.J.de Wilde & Duyfjes
- Xanthophyllum reflexum Meijden
- Xanthophyllum resupinatum Meijden
- Xanthophyllum reticulatum Chodat
- Xanthophyllum retinerve Meijden
- Xanthophyllum rheophilum W.J.de Wilde & Duyfjes
- Xanthophyllum rufum A.W.Benn.
- Xanthophyllum schizocarpon Chodat
- Xanthophyllum stipitatum A.W.Benn.
- Xanthophyllum subcoriaceum (Chodat) Meijden
- Xanthophyllum suberosum C.T.White
- Xanthophyllum sulphureum King
- Xanthophyllum sylvestre (Lour.) S.Moore
- Xanthophyllum tardicrescens Meijden
- Xanthophyllum tenue Chodat
- Xanthophyllum tenuipetalum Meijden
- Xanthophyllum trichocladum Chodat
- Xanthophyllum velutinum Chodat
- Xanthophyllum venosum King
- Xanthophyllum virens Roxb.
- Xanthophyllum vitellinum (Blume) D.Dietr.
- Xanthophyllum wrayi King
- Xanthophyllum yunnanense C.Y.Wu
- Xanthophyllum zeylanicum Meijden
