= Xanthophyllum adenotus =

Scientific classification
- Kingdom: Plantae
- Clade: Tracheophytes
- Clade: Angiosperms
- Clade: Eudicots
- Clade: Rosids
- Order: Fabales
- Family: Polygalaceae
- Genus: Xanthophyllum
- Species: X. adenotus

Binomial name
- Xanthophyllum adenotus Miq.

Varieties
- X. a. var. arsatii

Species of flowering plant

Xanthophyllum adenotus is a plant in the family Polygalaceae. The specific epithet adenotus is from the Greek meaning 'gland', referring to the leaf glands.

== Description ==
Xanthophyllum adenotus grows as a shrub or tree up to 15 metres (50 ft) tall with a trunk diameter of up to 25 centimetres (10 in). The flowers are pinkish to pale violet, drying dark red. The pale or reddish-brown fruits are round and measure up to 1.8 cm (1 in) in diameter.

== Distribution and habitat ==
Xanthophyllum adenotus grows naturally in Sumatra and Borneo. Its habitat is mixed dipterocarp forests from sea-level to 700 metres (2,300 ft) altitude.

== Varieties ==
One variety is currently recognised:

- X. adenotus var. arsatii
