= William Griffith (botanist) =

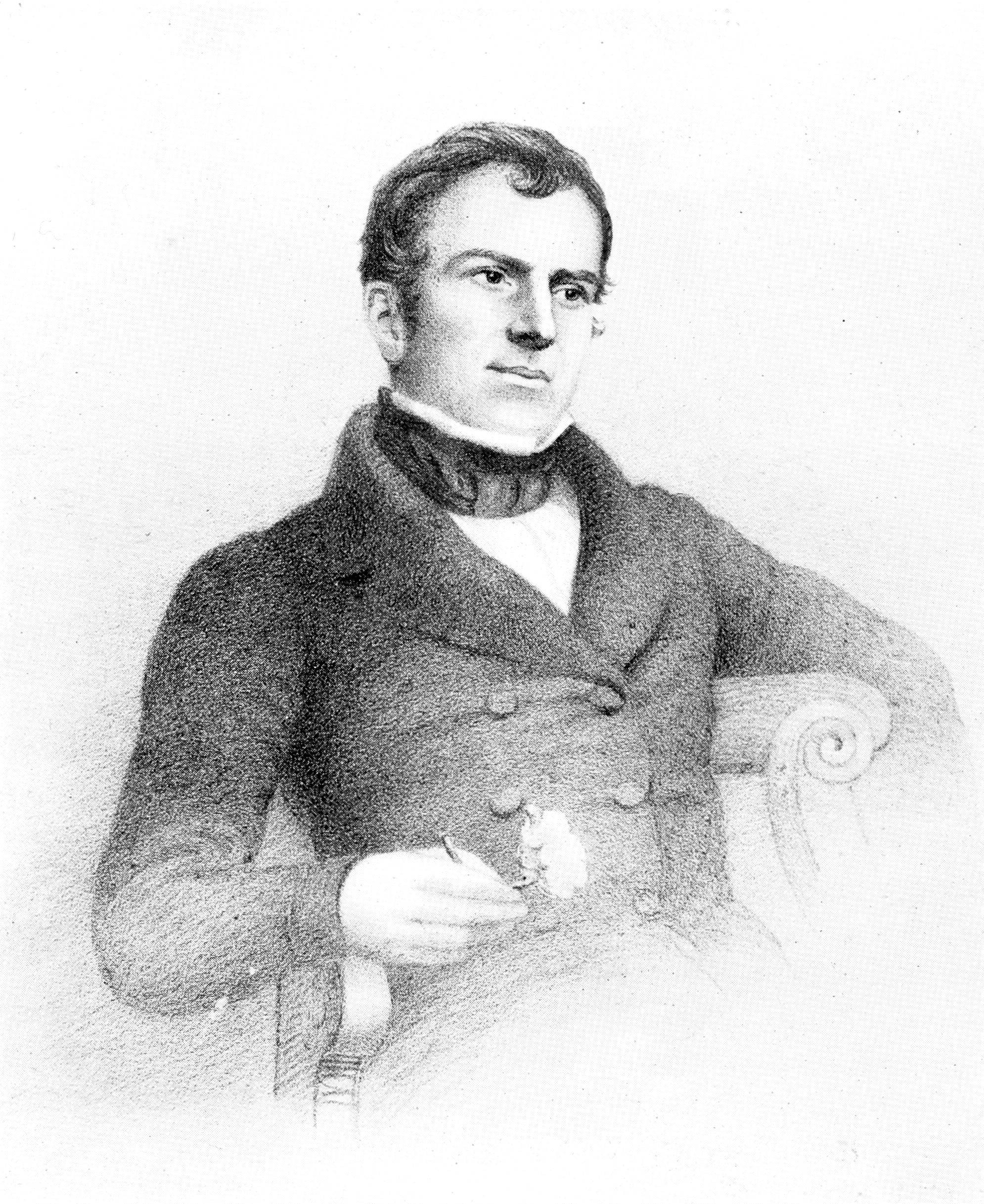
William Griffith in 1843

William Griffith FLS (4 March 1810 – 9 February 1845) was a British medical doctor, naturalist, and botanist. Griffith's botanical publications are from India and Burma. After a brief stay in Madras, he was assigned as a Civil Surgeon to Tenasserim, Burma, where he studied local plants and made collecting trips to the Barak River valley in Assam. He explored various parts of Burma, traveling the rivers, including the Irrawadi as far as Rangoon. He visited the highlands of Sikkim, and the region of the Himalayas around Shimla. Subsequently, Griffith was appointed as Civil Surgeon in Malacca, where he died of a parasitic liver disease.

== Biography ==
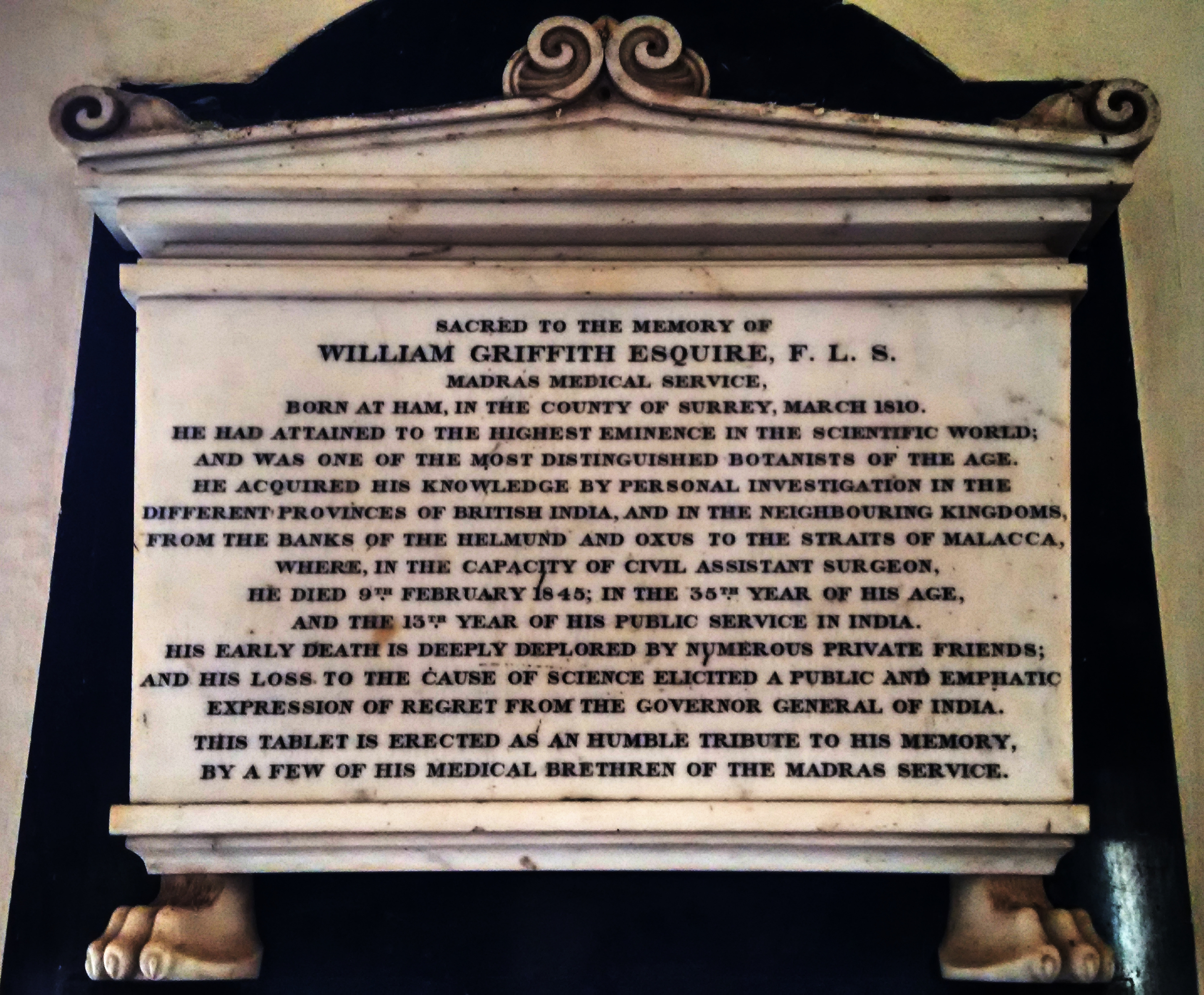
Memorial inscription at Madras

William was born at Ham on 4 March 1810, the son of Thomas Griffith. He studied under a private tutor along with brothers and even in his early days, took an interest in botany. He later went to London University where he studied under Robert Brown and John Lindley. He was also influenced by his friend R.H. Solly. He studied briefly at Paris under Charles Mirbel and at the Chelsea Physic Garden. He received the Linnaean Gold Medal of the Society of Apothecaries in 1830 (botanical class) and joined the East India Company as an assistant surgeon at Madras on 24 September 1832. In 1835 he was deputed to join Nathaniel Wallich and John McClelland on a mission to examine tea cultivation in northeastern India. The Commissioner in Assam, Jenkins, later deputed him to visit the Mishmi Hills and the Lohit valley. He served with Major Robert Boileau Pemberton's mission to Bhutan in 1837. In 1839 he visited the Indus region and studied the botany of Afghanistan, returning to 1841 and recuperating in Shimla before visiting his brother at Jabalpur. When Nathaniel Wallich visited South Africa, he was made in-charge of the Calcutta Botanical Garden and also acted as Professor of Botany at the Medical College from 1842 to 1844. On being relieved, he moved back to the Straits of Malacca, falling ill and dying of a liver disorder on 10 February 1845. The Calcutta Journal of Natural History, produced with assistance from him ceased and the subscriptions were used by John McClelland to publish Griffith's unpublished manuscripts.

He married Emily Henderson (sister of his brother's wife) in September 1844 and in December of the same year he sailed from Calcutta to Malacca but on arrival in January 1845 he suffered from hepatitis and died on 9 February. He was buried in Malacca. A memorial tablet was placed at the St. George's Cathedral in Madras.

=== Taxa named in honour ===
There are number of plants with specific names griffithianus, griffithia and griffithii named in honour of William Griffith. Including: Bulbophyllum griffithii, Euphorbia griffithii, Hopea griffithii, Iris griffithii, Larix griffithii, Magnolia griffithii and Xanthophyllum griffithii.

== Selected publications ==
- Griffith, William (1847) Journals of Travels in Assam Burma Bootan Affghanistan and the Neighbouring Countries Bishop's College Press, Calcutta; reprinted 2001 Munshiram Manoharlal Publishers, New Delhi.
