= Robert Hippolyte Chodat =

Swiss botanist and phycologist (1865–1934)

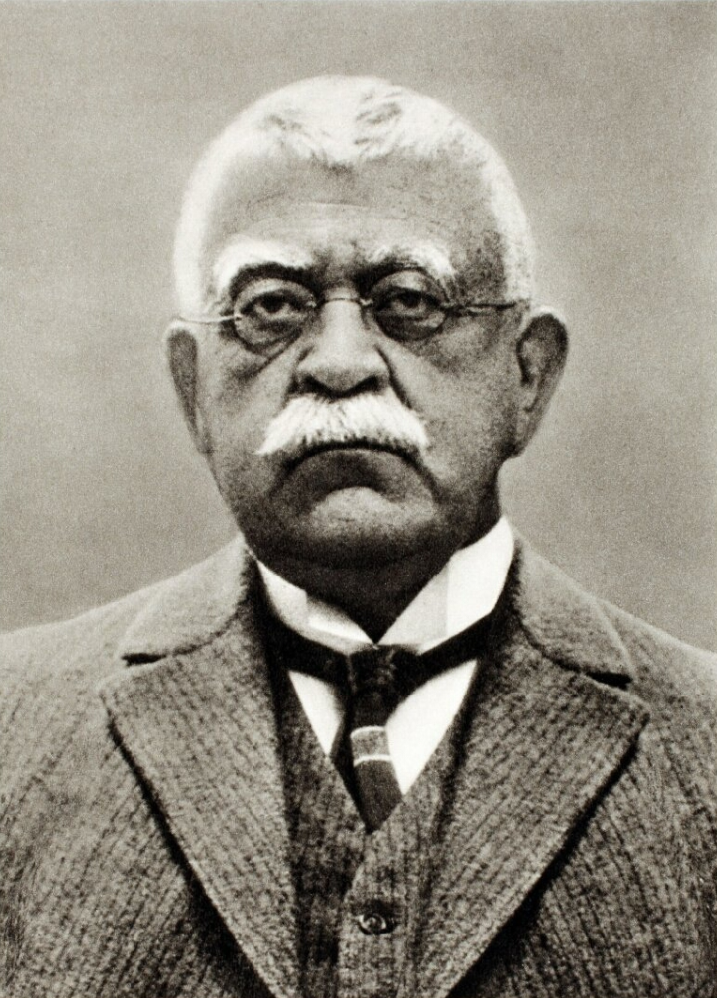
Robert Chodat

Robert Hippolyte Chodat (4 June 1865 – 28 April 1934) was a Swiss botanist, pharmacist and phycologist who was a professor. He founded and directed the botanical institute at the University of Geneva. He made collecting expeditions.

== Biography ==
Born on 6 April 1865 in Moutier in the Bernese Jura district of the canton of Bern to Ferdinand Chodat and Emma Robert, Chodat attended school in Bienne and Bern, then studied pharmacy and botany in Geneva, where he obtained a federal pharmacy diploma and a doctorate in natural sciences in 1887. Chodat ran his own pharmacy in Geneva until 1893. In 1888, he became a privat-docent in pharmacy at the University of Geneva. Chodat was appointed associate professor of medical and pharmaceutical botany in 1889, becoming a full professor two years later.

Chodat taught general and systematic botany from 1900 and was appointed director of the university's botanical institute, which he had founded in 1891 as the Laboratoire botanique. He served as rector from 1908 to 1910 as a director of the Jardin et laboratoire alpins de la Linnaea in Bourg-Saint-Pierre from 1915. In addition to excursions with his students (especially to the Mediterranean basin), Chodat conducted scientific expeditions to Paraguay and the United States. He was a member of numerous academies and the most important natural science societies in Europe, a Knight of the Legion of Honour, and a doctor honoris causa of ETH Zurich and the universities of Manchester, Liverpool, Leeds, Brussels and Cambridge. Chodat was the winner of the 1933 Linnean Medal. He died on 28 April 1934 in Carouge, near Geneva, aged 69.

== Work ==
Chodat published over 450 works covering a wide range of topics, including systematics, botanical geography, paleobotany, biochemistry, genetics and the biology of cryptogams (especially green algae). He was a leading authority of the botanical family Polygalaceae. In 1914, with Emil Hassler (1864–1937), Chodat collected plants in Región Oriental of Paraguay.

Among the doctoral researchers who worked in Chodat's botanical institute was the Romanian chemist Gabriela Chaborski, whose 1918 dissertation investigated thermophilic and cryophilic yeasts.

== Selected publications ==
- Monographia Polygalacearum, vol.1 1891, vol.2 1893.
- 1898–1907 : Plantae Hasslerianae (with Emil Hassler).
- Etude Critique et Experimentale sur le Polymorphisme des Algues, 1909.
- La Végétation du Paraguay. Résultats Scientifiques d'une Mission Botanique Suisse au Paraguay, (with Wilhelm Vischer 1890–1960).
- La biologie des plantes: Les plantes aquatiques, 1917.
