= Polygala attenuata =

Polygala attenuata may refer to three different species of plants:

- Polygala attenuata Nutt., a taxonomic synonym for tall pinebarren milkwort (Senega cymosa)
- Polygala attenuata G.Lodd. ex G.Don, a taxonomic synonym for Polygala fruticosa
- Polygala attenuata Hook., a taxonomic synonym for Senega hookeri
