= Polygala corymbosa =

Polygala corymbosa may refer to two different species of plants:

- Polygala corymbosa Michx., a taxonomic synonym for tall pinebarren milkwort (Senega cymosa)
- Polygala corymbosa Nutt., a taxonomic synonym for Senega ramosa
