= Polygala bicolor =

Polygala bicolor may refer to three different species of plants:

- Polygala bicolor Hook., a taxonomic synonym for Boykin's milkwort (Senega boykinii)
- Polygala bicolor Kunth, a taxonomic synonym for Senega ambigua
- Polygala bicolor Vell., a taxonomic synonym for Acanthocladus dichromus
