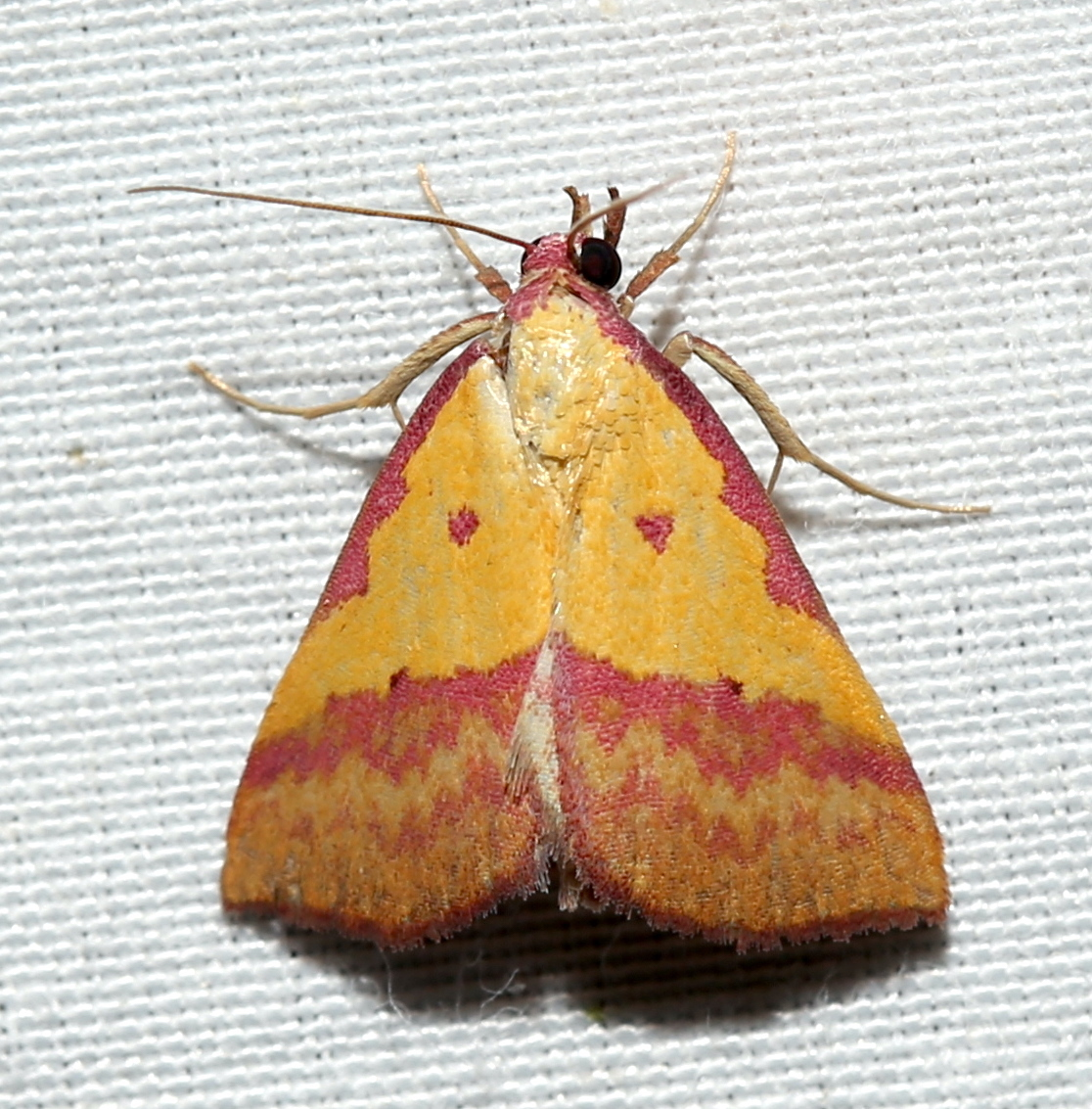

Scientific classification
- Kingdom: Animalia
- Phylum: Arthropoda
- Clade: Pancrustacea
- Class: Insecta
- Order: Lepidoptera
- Superfamily: Noctuoidea
- Family: Erebidae
- Genus: Phytometra
- Species: P. rhodarialis

Binomial name
- Phytometra rhodarialis Walker, 1859

Synonyms
- Phytometra semupurpurea (Walker, 1865) (form); Phytometra confinisalis (Walker, 1866); Phytometra rosalba (Grote, 1873)

= Phytometra rhodarialis =

Species of moth

Phytometra rhodarialis, the pink-bordered yellow, is a moth of the family Erebidae. The species was first described by Francis Walker in 1859. It is found from southern Ontario in Canada and Missouri and New Hampshire in the United States, south to Florida and Texas in the United States, possibly only as a stray northward.

The wingspan is about 20 mm. There are two or more generations in Ohio and New Jersey and more generations southward.

The larvae feed on Polygala species. Larvae have been reared on Polygala lutea and Polygala mariana.
