= Polygala viridescens =

Polygala viridescens may refer to two different species of plants:

- Polygala viridescens L., a taxonomic synonym for purple milkwort (Senega boykinii)
- Polygala viridescens Walter, a taxonomic synonym for candyroot (Senega nana)
