= Whorled milkwort =

Whorled milkwort is a common name for several plants and may refer to:

- Polygala ambigua, flowering plant in the milkwort family first described in 1818 and native to the United States and Japan
- Polygala verticillata, flowering plant in the milkwort family native to the United States and Mexico
