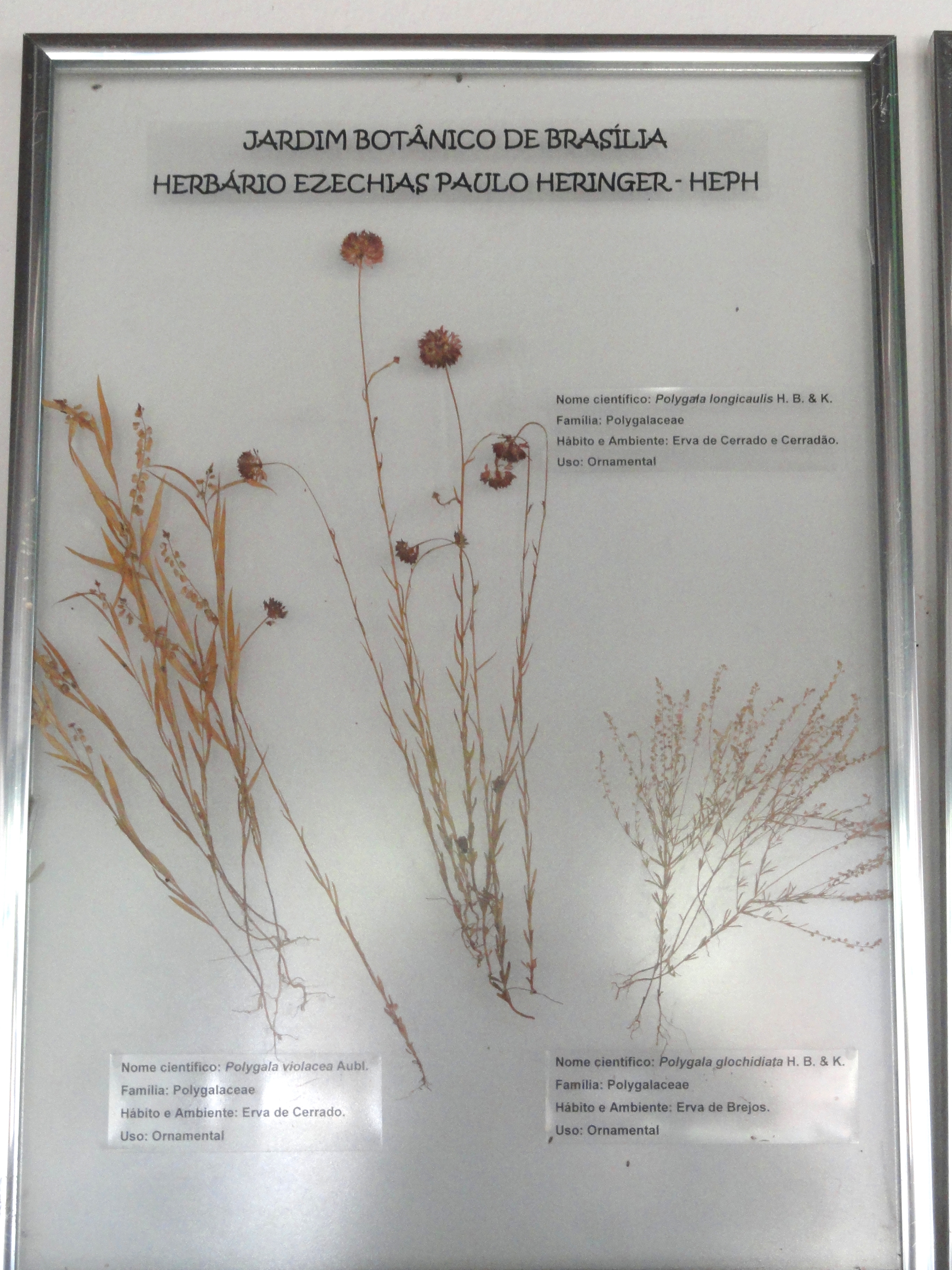
- Specimens of Senega violacea, Senega longicaulis, and Senega glochidiata

Scientific classification
- Kingdom: Plantae
- Clade: Embryophytes
- Clade: Tracheophytes
- Clade: Spermatophytes
- Clade: Angiosperms
- Clade: Eudicots
- Clade: Rosids
- Order: Fabales
- Family: Polygalaceae
- Genus: Senega
- Species: S. glochidiata

Binomial name
- Senega glochidiata (Kunth) J.F.B.Pastore

Synonyms
- List: Polygala glochidiata Kunth; Polygala glochidiata f. typica S.F.Blake; Polygala glochidiata var. kunthiana Chodat; Polygala glochidiata f. leucantha S.F.Blake; Polygala glochidiata var. pallida Chodat; Polygala glochidiata var. raddiana Chodat; Polygala glochidiata var. spergulifolia Chodat; Polygala glochidiata var. subaphylla (A.St.-Hil. & Moq.) Marques; Polygala raddiana var. subaphylla A.St.-Hil. & Moq.; Polygala spergulifolia A.St.-Hil. & Moq.

= Senega glochidiata =

Species of flowering plant

Senega glochidiata, the tropical milkwort, is a flowering plant in the Senega genus and Polygalaceae family. An annual, it grows in sandy gravelly washes, rocky grasslands, and slopes in Arizona. It has also been reported to grow in Tropical America and Cuba.

A specimen was collected in the Kusad Mountains of the Rupununi region in Guyana. The Field Museum has a specimen from Brazil. It has also been collected in Venezuela.

== See also ==
- List of flora of the Sonoran Desert Region by common name
