= Broom milkwort =

Broom milkwort is a common name for several plants and may refer to:

- Comesperma scoparium, native to Australia
- Senega scoparioides, native to parts ofnthe southwestern United States and northern Mexico
