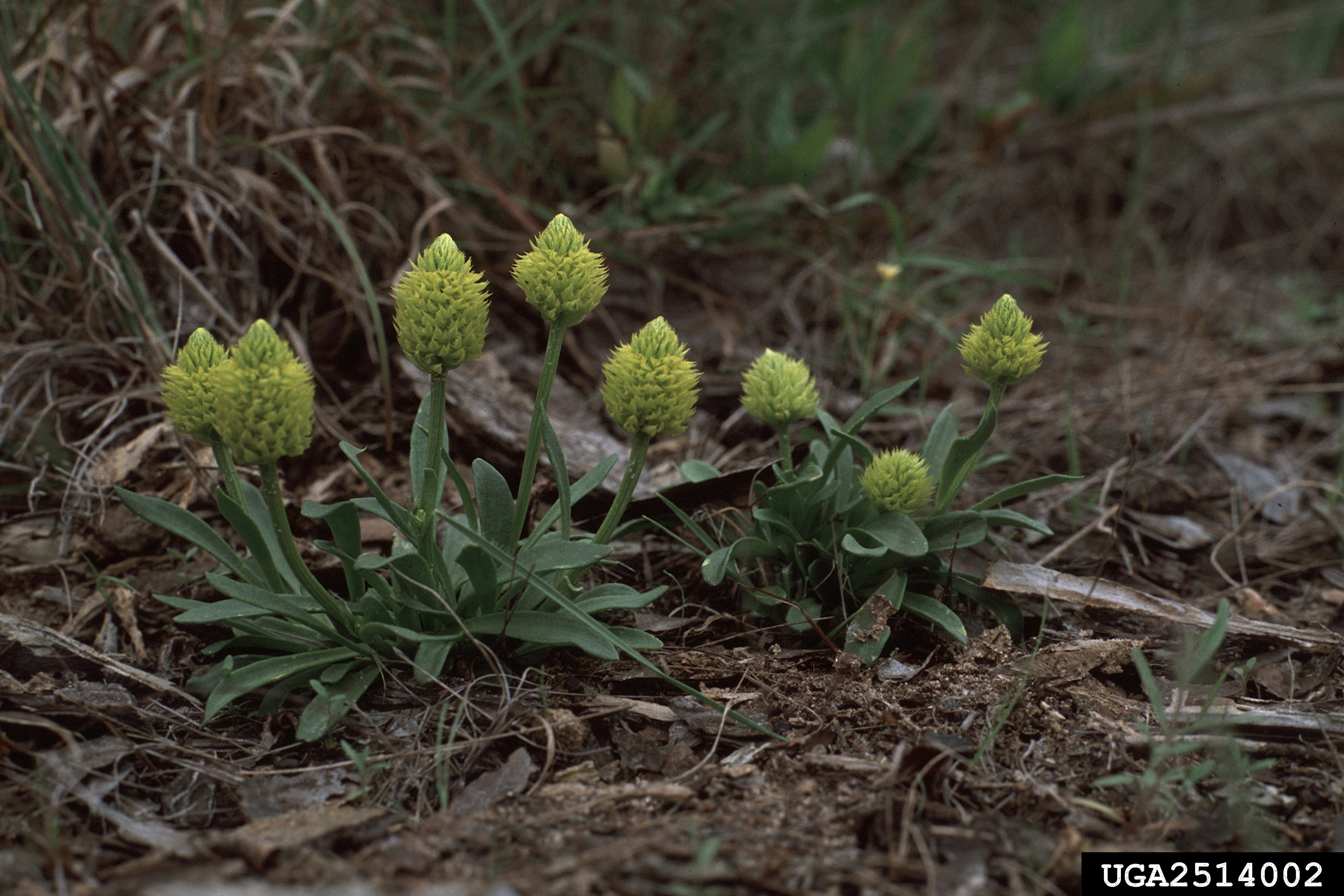

Scientific classification
- Kingdom: Plantae
- Clade: Embryophytes
- Clade: Tracheophytes
- Clade: Spermatophytes
- Clade: Angiosperms
- Clade: Eudicots
- Clade: Rosids
- Order: Fabales
- Family: Polygalaceae
- Genus: Senega
- Species: S. nana

Binomial name
- Senega nana (Michx.) J.F.B.Pastore & J.R.Abbott

Synonyms
- List: Polygala lutea var. nana Michx.; Polygala nana (Michx.) DC.; Psilotaxis nana (Michx.) Raf.; Pylostachya nana (Michx.) Raf.; Polygala hyemalis Raf.; Polygala nana var. humillima Chodat; Polygala viridescens Walter; Pylostachya hyemalis Raf.

= Senega nana =

Species of flowering plant

Senega nana, commonly known as candyroot or low bachelors' buttons, is a small species of herbaceous plant native to the south-eastern United States. The root has a sweet liquorice flavor when it is chewed, but it is usually hidden underground until the plant flowers. The seeds of candyroot are dispersed by ants.

== Taxonomy ==
French botanist André Michaux described candyroot as a variety of Polygala lutea in 1803. Swiss botanist Augustin Pyramus de Candolle reclassified it as a species in 1824. The species name is the Latin word nanus "dwarf".

== Description ==
Candyroot grows as a clumping herbaceous plant 10–15 cm (4–6 in) tall, more commonly 5–10 cm (2–4 in) tall. Growing from the base of the plant are the spathulate (spoon-shaped) leaves, which are 1.5–5 cm (1/2–2 in) long and 0.4–2 cm (1/4–3/4 in) cm wide. The yellow flowerheads are composed of tiny flowers arranged in racemes, and are 2–4 cm (3/4–1 1/2 in) high by 1.5 cm (1/2 in) wide. They appear from April to June, from March to October in Alabama, and year-round in the Everglades. The seeds are smaller than 1 mm in size. The edible root tastes of licorice.

Senega nana resembles Senega lutea, which is a taller plant. It also resembles the rare species P. smallii of Miami-Dade County, which has seeds longer than 1 mm.

== Distribution and habitat ==
Senega nana is found across the south-eastern United States from far eastern Texas through Louisiana and Arkansas to Florida and north as far as the Carolinas. Arkansas, where it is found in Ashley, Bradley and Calhoun Counties, marks the northwestern limits of its range. It grows in moist soil in meadows or coniferous woodlands.

== Ecology ==
Senega nana is insect pollinated and is recorded to have been visited in northern Florida by Augochlorella aurata, Augochloropsis metallica, Augochloropsis sumptuosaand Ceratina.
