= Senega altomontana =

Scientific classification
- Kingdom: Plantae
- Clade: Embryophytes
- Clade: Tracheophytes
- Clade: Angiosperms
- Clade: Eudicots
- Clade: Rosids
- Order: Fabales
- Family: Polygalaceae
- Genus: Senega
- Species: S. altomontana

Binomial name
- Senega altomontana (Lüdtke, Boldrini & Miotto) J.F.B.Pastore

Synonyms
- Polygala altomontana Lüdtke, Boldrini & Miotto

Species of flowering plant

Senega altomontana is a flowering plant in the Senega genus and Polygalaceae family. A subshrub, it grows in temperate southern Brazil. In 2009 it was documented as a "new species". Chemical compounds in it have been studied.
