= Senega distans =

Scientific classification
- Kingdom: Plantae
- Clade: Embryophytes
- Clade: Tracheophytes
- Clade: Spermatophytes
- Clade: Angiosperms
- Clade: Eudicots
- Clade: Rosids
- Order: Fabales
- Family: Polygalaceae
- Genus: Senega
- Species: S. distans

Binomial name
- Senega distans (A.St.-Hil. & Moq.) J.F.B.Pastore

Synonyms
- Polygala distans A.St.-Hil.; Polygala leptolopha var. flexuosa Chodat

Species of flowering plant

Senega distans is a flowering plant in the genus Senega and family Polygalaceae. A perennial, it grows in Goiás and Minas Gerais in Brazil.

Augustin Saint-Hilaire provided the first description in 1829.
