= Senega timoutou =

- Type specimen from Guyana in the British Museum collection

Scientific classification
- Kingdom: Plantae
- Clade: Tracheophytes
- Clade: Angiosperms
- Clade: Eudicots
- Clade: Rosids
- Order: Fabales
- Family: Polygalaceae
- Genus: Senega
- Species: S. timoutou

Binomial name
- Senega timoutou (Aubl.) J.F.B.Pastore

Synonyms
- List: Polygala timoutou Aubl.; Polygala fimutu J.F.Gmel.; Polygala lupulina Willd.; Polygala timoutou var. incisa Chodat; Polygala timutu Poir.; Polygala uliginosa Pers.

Species of flowering plant

Senega timoutou is a flowering plant in the genus Senega and the family Polygalaceae.

In 2023, the species in the genus Polygala that are in the Americas were reclassified to the genus Senega. This plant is an annual. Its range is across countries in South America, Trinidad, and parts of Central America.
