= Senega crucianelloides =

Scientific classification
- Kingdom: Plantae
- Clade: Embryophytes
- Clade: Tracheophytes
- Clade: Spermatophytes
- Clade: Angiosperms
- Clade: Eudicots
- Clade: Rosids
- Order: Fabales
- Family: Polygalaceae
- Genus: Senega
- Species: S. crucianelloides

Binomial name
- Senega crucianelloides (DC.) J.F.B.Pastore & J.R.Abbott

Synonyms
- Polygala crucianelloides DC.; Polygala asperuloides DC.

Flowering plant species

Senega crucianelloides is a species of flowering plant in the milkwort family Polygalaceae. It is endemic to the Dominican Republic and Puerto Rico.
