= Senega chapmanii =

Conservation status
- Apparently Secure (NatureServe)

Scientific classification
- Kingdom: Plantae
- Clade: Embryophytes
- Clade: Tracheophytes
- Clade: Spermatophytes
- Clade: Angiosperms
- Clade: Eudicots
- Clade: Rosids
- Order: Fabales
- Family: Polygalaceae
- Genus: Senega
- Species: S. chapmanii

Binomial name
- Senega chapmanii (Torr. & A.Gray) J.F.B.Pastore & J.R.Abbott

Synonyms
- Polygala chapmanii Torr. & A.Gray

Species of flowering plant

Senega chapmanii is a flowering plant species in the milkwort family (Polygalaceae). It is endemic to states in the south-eastern United States bordering the Gulf of Mexico including Alabama and parts of the Florida panhandle but has not been reported from Texas. It is an annual and grows to about two feet tall. It is a dicot.
