= Senega africana =

Scientific classification
- Kingdom: Plantae
- Clade: Tracheophytes
- Clade: Angiosperms
- Clade: Eudicots
- Clade: Rosids
- Order: Fabales
- Family: Polygalaceae
- Genus: Senega
- Species: S. africana

Binomial name
- Senega africana (Chodat) J.F.B.Pastore

Synonyms
- Polygala africana Chodat

Species of flowering plant

Senega africana is a species of flowering plant in the milkwort family (Polygalaceae). It was first described in 1893.

== Distribution ==
It is found in southern Africa (Angola, DRC, Eswatini, Malawi, Mozambique, Namibia, Northern Provinces, Tanzania, Zambia, and Zimbabwe).

== Description ==
Senega africana grows to a height of 8–15 centimeters with stems branching. Its flowers are pink.
