= Senega balduini =

Scientific classification
- Kingdom: Plantae
- Clade: Embryophytes
- Clade: Tracheophytes
- Clade: Spermatophytes
- Clade: Angiosperms
- Clade: Eudicots
- Clade: Rosids
- Order: Fabales
- Family: Polygalaceae
- Genus: Senega
- Species: S. balduini

Binomial name
- Senega balduini (Nutt.) J.F.B.Pastore & J.R.Abbott

Synonyms
- Pilostaxis balduini (Nutt.) Small; Polygala balduini Nutt.

Species of flowering plant

Senega balduini, or Baldwin's milkwort, is a species of flowering plant in the milkwort family Polygalaceae. It grows in the south-eastern United States. It has alternate leaves and grows to about 3 feet high. A white or greenish flowering milkwort, it grows in wet pine flatwoods, marshes, and coastal swales. It is an annual, biennial, or (in south Florida) perennial.
