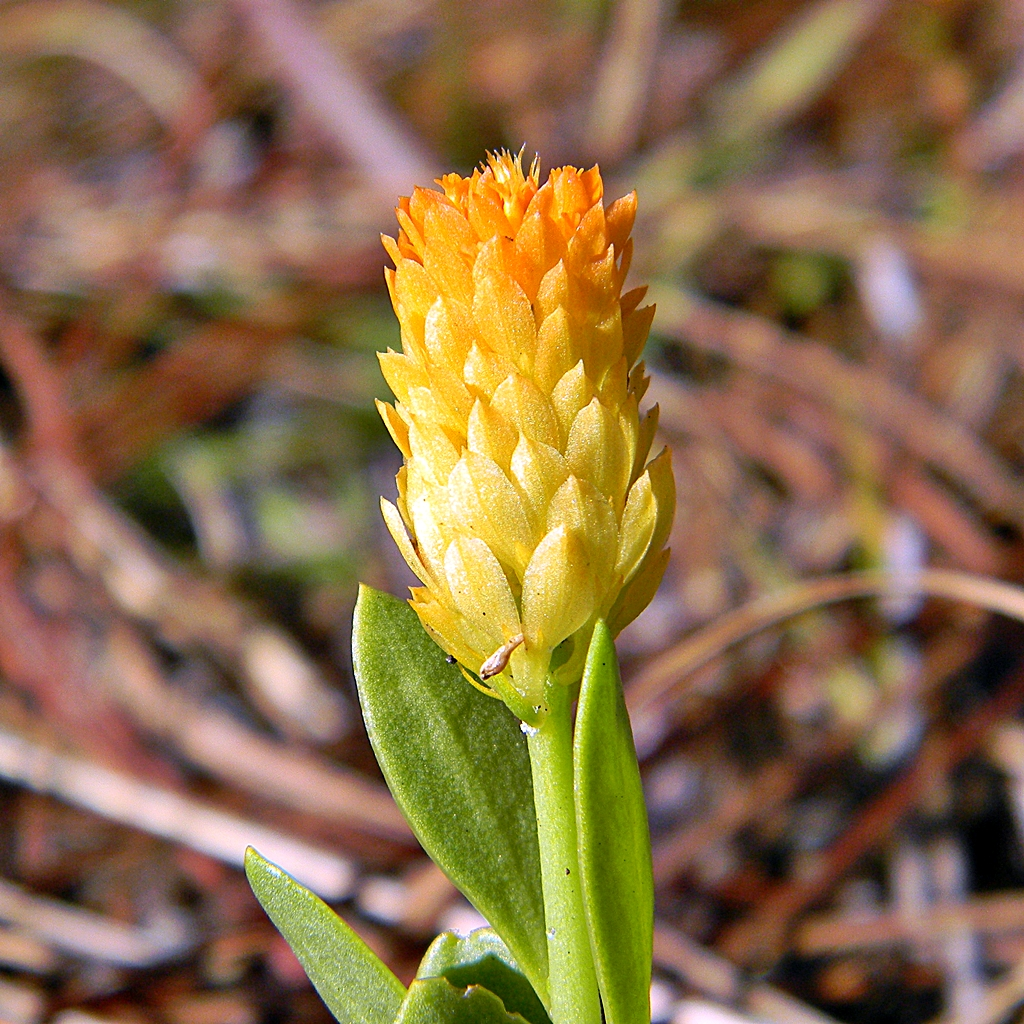
- Senega lutea

Scientific classification
- Kingdom: Plantae
- Clade: Tracheophytes
- Clade: Angiosperms
- Clade: Eudicots
- Clade: Rosids
- Order: Fabales
- Family: Polygalaceae
- Genus: Senega (DC.) Spach

Synonyms
- List: Anthalogea Raf. nom. rej.; Corymbula Raf. nom. rej.; Galypola Nieuwl.; Leptrochia nom. rej.; Pilostaxis Raf. nom. superfl.; Pylostachya Raf. nom. rej.; Senegaria Raf. nom. rej.; Sexilia Raf. nom. rej.

= Senega =

Genus of flowering plant

Senega is a genus of flowering plants in the milkwort family (Polygalaceae) native to the Americas, tropical and southern Africa, and Madagascar. It was resurrected from the genus Polygala in 2023. There are about 229 known species in the genus.

== Traditional medicine ==
The North American species Senega officinalis was introduced to Europe in the 1700s and was sold widely by pharmacists into the 1800s. It is toxic in large quantities.

== Species ==
As of July 2026, Plants of the World Online accepted the following species:

- Senega abietina (Chodat) J.F.B.Pastore
- Senega abreui (Marques & J.F.B.Pastore) J.F.B.Pastore
- Senega adenophora (DC.) J.F.B.Pastore
- Senega adenophylla (A.St.-Hil. & Moq.) J.F.B.Pastore
- Senega afra (Paiva) J.F.B.Pastore
- Senega africana (Chodat) J.F.B.Pastore
- Senega alba (Nutt.) J.F.B.Pastore & J.R.Abbott
- Senega altomontana (Lüdtke, Boldrini & Miotto) J.F.B.Pastore
- Senega ambigua (Nutt.) J.F.B.Pastore & J.R.Abbott
- Senega anderssonii (B.L.Rob.) J.F.B.Pastore
- Senega aparinoides (Hook. & Arn.) J.F.B.Pastore & J.R.Abbott
- Senega aphylla (A.W.Benn.) J.F.B.Pastore
- Senega apparicioi (Brade) J.F.B.Pastore
- Senega appendiculata (Vell.) J.F.B.Pastore & J.R.Abbott
- Senega appressa (Benth.) J.F.B.Pastore
- Senega aquilonia (Fernald & B.G.Schub.) J.F.B.Pastore & J.R.Abbott
- Senega argentinensis (Chodat) J.F.B.Pastore & Agust.Martinez
- Senega aspalatha (L.) J.F.B.Pastore & Agust.Martinez
- Senega asperuloides (Kunth) J.F.B.Pastore
- Senega atropurpurea (A.St.-Hil. & Moq.) J.F.B.Pastore
- Senega australis (A.W.Benn.) J.F.B.Pastore
- Senega balduini (Nutt.) J.F.B.Pastore & J.R.Abbott
- Senega berlandieri (S.Watson) J.F.B.Pastore & J.R.Abbott
- Senega berteroana (DC.) J.F.B.Pastore
- Senega bevilacquae (Marques) J.F.B.Pastore
- Senega blakeana (Steyerm.) J.F.B.Pastore
- Senega bocainensis (Brade) J.F.B.Pastore
- Senega boliviensis (A.W.Benn.) J.F.B.Pastore
- Senega bonariensis (Grondona) J.F.B.Pastore
- Senega boykinii (Nutt.) J.F.B.Pastore & J.R.Abbott
- Senega brachyptera (Griseb.) J.F.B.Pastore & J.R.Abbott
- Senega bracteata (A.W.Benn.) J.F.B.Pastore
- Senega brasiliensis (L.) J.F.B.Pastore
- Senega brevifolia (Nutt.) J.F.B.Pastore & J.R.Abbott
- Senega bringelii (J.F.B.Pastore & Antar) J.F.B.Pastore
- Senega bryoides (A.St.-Hil. & Moq.) J.F.B.Pastore
- Senega calcarata J.F.B.Pastore
- Senega campestris (Gardner) J.F.B.Pastore
- Senega capillaris (E.Mey. ex Harv.) J.F.B.Pastore
- Senega capitolensis (J.F.B.Pastore) J.F.B.Pastore
- Senega carautana Marques ex J.F.B.Pastore
- Senega carphoides (Chodat) J.F.B.Pastore
- Senega ceciliana (Marques & J.F.B.Pastore) J.F.B.Pastore
- Senega celosioides (Mart. ex A.W.Benn.) J.F.B.Pastore
- Senega chamaecyparis (Chodat) J.F.B.Pastore
- Senega chapadensis (Chodat ex Grondona) J.F.B.Pastore
- Senega chapmanii (Torr. & A.Gray) J.F.B.Pastore & J.R.Abbott
- Senega cneorum (A.St.-Hil. & Moq.) J.F.B.Pastore
- Senega conferta (A.W.Benn.) J.F.B.Pastore & J.R.Abbott
- Senega cordeiroi J.F.B.Pastore
- Senega coriacea (A.St.-Hil. & Moq.) J.F.B.Pastore
- Senega corifolia (Triana & Planch.) J.F.B.Pastore & Agust.Martinez
- Senega corralitae (Tombesi & R.Kiesling) J.F.B.Pastore & Agust.Martinez
- Senega crenata (C.W.James) J.F.B.Pastore & J.R.Abbott
- Senega crinita (Chodat) J.F.B.Pastore & J.R.Abbott
- Senega crucianelloides (DC.) J.F.B.Pastore & J.R.Abbott
- Senega cruciata (L.) J.F.B.Pastore & J.R.Abbott
- Senega cumbrensis (Wurdack) J.F.B.Pastore
- Senega curtissii (A.Gray) J.F.B.Pastore & J.R.Abbott
- Senega cuspidata (DC.) J.F.B.Pastore
- Senega cymosa (Walter) J.F.B.Pastore & J.R.Abbott
- Senega cyparissias (A.St.-Hil. & Moq.) J.F.B.Pastore & Agust.Martinez
- Senega darwiniana (A.W.Benn.) J.F.B.Pastore & Agust.Martinez
- Senega densifolia (A.St.-Hil. & Moq.) J.F.B.Pastore
- Senega densiracemosa (Lüdtke & Miotto) J.F.B.Pastore
- Senega desiderata (Speg.) J.F.B.Pastore & Agust.Martinez
- Senega distans (A.St.-Hil. & Moq.) J.F.B.Pastore
- Senega dolichocarpa (S.F.Blake) J.F.B.Pastore & J.R.Abbott
- Senega duarteana (A.St.-Hil. & Moq.) J.F.B.Pastore
- Senega equisetoides (A.St.-Hil. & Moq.) J.F.B.Pastore
- Senega exasperata (Chodat) J.F.B.Pastore
- Senega fendleri (Chodat) J.F.B.Pastore
- Senega fernandesiana (Paiva) J.F.B.Pastore
- Senega filicaulis (Baill.) J.F.B.Pastore
- Senega filiformis J.F.B.Pastore
- Senega fontellana (Marques & A.C.A.Aguiar) J.F.B.Pastore
- Senega franchetii (Chodat) J.F.B.Pastore
- Senega galapageia (Hook.f.) J.F.B.Pastore
- Senega galioides (Poir.) J.F.B.Pastore
- Senega glaziowii (Chodat) J.F.B.Pastore
- Senega glochidiata (Kunth) J.F.B.Pastore
- Senega gnidioides (Willd.) J.F.B.Pastore & Agust.Martinez
- Senega gracilis (Kunth) J.F.B.Pastore
- Senega gracillima (S.Watson) J.F.B.Pastore & J.R.Abbott
- Senega graebiana (Chodat) J.F.B.Pastore
- Senega grazielae (Marques) J.F.B.Pastore
- Senega guaranitica (Chodat) J.F.B.Pastore
- Senega harleyi (Marques) J.F.B.Pastore
- Senega hassleriana (Chodat) J.F.B.Pastore
- Senega hecatantha (Urb.) J.F.B.Pastore & J.R.Abbott
- Senega hemipterocarpa (A.Gray) J.F.B.Pastore & J.R.Abbott
- Senega herbiola (A.St.-Hil. & Moq.) J.F.B.Pastore
- Senega hieronymi (Chodat) J.F.B.Pastore & Agust.Martinez
- Senega hintonii (S.F.Blake) J.F.B.Pastore & J.R.Abbott
- Senega hookeri (Torr. & A.Gray) J.F.B.Pastore & J.R.Abbott
- Senega hygrophila (Kunth) J.F.B.Pastore
- Senega incarnata (L.) J.F.B.Pastore & J.R.Abbott
- Senega intermedia (Marques) J.F.B.Pastore
- Senega irwinii (Wurdack) J.F.B.Pastore
- Senega jardimii (J.F.B.Pastore) J.F.B.Pastore
- Senega jefensis (W.H.Lewis) J.F.B.Pastore & J.R.Abbott
- Senega judithea (J.F.B.Pastore) J.F.B.Pastore
- Senega jujuyensis (Grondona) J.F.B.Pastore & Agust.Martinez
- Senega juncea (A.St.-Hil. & Moq.) J.F.B.Pastore
- Senega kalunga (J.F.B.Pastore) J.F.B.Pastore
- Senega kurtzii Agust.Martinez & J.F.B.Pastore
- Senega lancifolia (A.St.-Hil. & Moq.) J.F.B.Pastore
- Senega laxiflora (Grondona) J.F.B.Pastore
- Senega lecardii (Chodat) J.F.B.Pastore
- Senega leptostachys (Shuttlew. ex A.Gray) J.F.B.Pastore & J.R.Abbott
- Senega leucantha (A.W.Benn.) J.F.B.Pastore
- Senega lewtonii (Small) J.F.B.Pastore & J.R.Abbott
- Senega linoides (Poir.) J.F.B.Pastore
- Senega longicaulis (Kunth) J.F.B.Pastore
- Senega longiflora J.F.B.Pastore
- Senega lutea (L.) J.F.B.Pastore & J.R.Abbott
- Senega lycopodioides (Chodat) J.F.B.Pastore
- Senega malmeana (Chodat) J.F.B.Pastore
- Senega mandonii (Chodat) J.F.B.Pastore
- Senega mariana (Mill.) J.F.B.Pastore & J.R.Abbott
- Senega matogrossensis (J.F.B.Pastore) J.F.B.Pastore
- Senega mcvaughii (T.Wendt) J.F.B.Pastore & J.R.Abbott
- Senega mendocina (Phil.) J.F.B.Pastore & Agust.Martinez
- Senega mexicana (Moc. ex Cav.) J.F.B.Pastore & J.R.Abbott
- Senega michelleana (J.F.B.Pastore) J.F.B.Pastore
- Senega millspaughiana (Paiva) J.F.B.Pastore & J.R.Abbott
- Senega minarum (J.F.B.Pastore) J.F.B.Pastore
- Senega minima (Pohl ex A.W.Benn.) J.F.B.Pastore
- Senega minuta (Paiva) J.F.B.Pastore
- Senega molluginifolia (A.St.-Hil. & Moq.) J.F.B.Pastore
- Senega monosperma (A.W.Benn.) J.F.B.Pastore
- Senega moquiniana (A.St.-Hil. & Moq.) J.F.B.Pastore
- Senega multiceps (Mart. ex A.W.Benn.) J.F.B.Pastore
- Senega nana (Michx.) J.F.B.Pastore & J.R.Abbott
- Senega nemoralis (A.W.Benn.) J.F.B.Pastore
- Senega nevadensis (Agust.Martinez & J.F.B.Pastore) J.F.B.Pastore & Agust.Martinez
- Senega nikeliophila (Marques & J.F.B.Pastore) J.F.B.Pastore
- Senega northorpiana (R.N.Banerjee) J.F.B.Pastore
- Senega nudicaulis (A.W.Benn.) J.F.B.Pastore
- Senega nuttallii (Torr. & A.Gray) J.F.B.Pastore & J.R.Abbott
- Senega obovata (A.St.-Hil. & Moq.) J.F.B.Pastore
- Senega oedophylla (S.F.Blake) J.F.B.Pastore & J.R.Abbott
- Senega officinalis Spach
- Senega omissa (Bal.-Tul. & P.Herrera) J.F.B.Pastore & J.R.Abbott
- Senega paganuccii (J.F.B.Pastore) J.F.B.Pastore
- Senega paniculata (L.) J.F.B.Pastore & J.R.Abbott
- Senega patagonica (Phil.) J.F.B.Pastore & Agust.Martinez
- Senega patens (J.F.B.Pastore & Marques) J.F.B.Pastore
- Senega payuniensis (Agust.Martinez & J.F.B.Pastore) J.F.B.Pastore & Agust.Martinez
- Senega persistens (A.W.Benn.) J.F.B.Pastore & Agust.Martinez
- Senega peruviana (A.W.Benn.) J.F.B.Pastore
- Senega philippiana (Chodat) J.F.B.Pastore & Agust.Martinez
- Senega poaya (Mart.) J.F.B.Pastore
- Senega polygama (Walter) J.F.B.Pastore & J.R.Abbott
- Senega pseudocoriacea (Chodat) J.F.B.Pastore
- Senega pseudoerica (A.St.-Hil. & Moq.) J.F.B.Pastore
- Senega pseudosericea (Chodat) J.F.B.Pastore
- Senega pseudovariabilis (Chodat) J.F.B.Pastore
- Senega pulchella (A.St.-Hil. & Moq.) J.F.B.Pastore
- Senega pumila (Norlind) J.F.B.Pastore
- Senega punctata (A.W.Benn.) J.F.B.Pastore
- Senega pygmaea (A.St.-Hil. & Moq.) J.F.B.Pastore
- Senega quitensis (Turcz.) J.F.B.Pastore
- Senega raddiana (A.St.-Hil. & Moq.) J.F.B.Pastore
- Senega ramosa (Elliott) J.F.B.Pastore & J.R.Abbott
- Senega regnellii (Chodat) J.F.B.Pastore
- Senega remota (A.W.Benn.) J.F.B.Pastore
- Senega resedoides (A.St.-Hil.) J.F.B.Pastore
- Senega revoluta (Gardner) J.F.B.Pastore
- Senega rhynchosperma (S.F.Blake) J.F.B.Pastore & J.R.Abbott
- Senega rhysocarpa (S.F.Blake) J.F.B.Pastore & J.R.Abbott
- Senega rigida (A.St.-Hil. & Moq.) J.F.B.Pastore
- Senega riograndensis (Lüdtke & Miotto) J.F.B.Pastore
- Senega robusta (Grondona) J.F.B.Pastore
- Senega rosei (Hicken) J.F.B.Pastore & Agust.Martinez
- Senega rostrata (Chodat) J.F.B.Pastore
- Senega roubienna (A.St.-Hil. & Moq.) J.F.B.Pastore
- Senega rugelii (Shuttlew. ex Chapm.) J.F.B.Pastore & J.R.Abbott
- Senega sabuletorum (Skottsb.) J.F.B.Pastore & Agust.Martinez
- Senega saginoides (Griseb.) J.F.B.Pastore & J.R.Abbott
- Senega salasiana (Gay) J.F.B.Pastore & Agust.Martinez
- Senega salviniana (A.W.Benn.) J.F.B.Pastore & J.R.Abbott
- Senega sanariapoana (Steyerm.) J.F.B.Pastore
- Senega sancti-georgii (L.Riley) J.F.B.Pastore
- Senega sanguinea (L.) J.F.B.Pastore & J.R.Abbott
- Senega sansibarensis (Gürke) J.F.B.Pastore
- Senega santacruzensis (Grondona) J.F.B.Pastore & Agust.Martinez
- Senega saprophytica (Chodat ex Grondona) J.F.B.Pastore
- Senega savannarum (Chodat) J.F.B.Pastore
- Senega scoparioides (Chodat) J.F.B.Pastore & J.R.Abbott
- Senega sedoides (A.W.Benn.) J.F.B.Pastore
- Senega selaginoides (A.W.Benn.) J.F.B.Pastore
- Senega sellowiana (A.St.-Hil. & Moq.) J.F.B.Pastore
- Senega semialata (S.Watson) J.F.B.Pastore & J.R.Abbott
- Senega sericea (A.W.Benn.) J.F.B.Pastore
- Senega setacea (Michx.) J.F.B.Pastore & J.R.Abbott
- Senega shinnersii (W.H.Lewis) J.F.B.Pastore & J.R.Abbott
- Senega sinaloae (S.F.Blake) J.F.B.Pastore & J.R.Abbott
- Senega sincorensis (Chodat) J.F.B.Pastore
- Senega sipapoana (Wurdack) J.F.B.Pastore
- Senega smallii (R.R.Sm. & D.B.Ward) J.F.B.Pastore & J.R.Abbott
- Senega solieri (Gay) J.F.B.Pastore & Agust.Martinez
- Senega spathulata (Griseb.) J.F.B.Pastore & J.R.Abbott
- Senega spicata (Chodat) J.F.B.Pastore
- Senega spinescens (Gillies ex Hook. & Arn.) J.F.B.Pastore & Agust.Martinez
- Senega squamifolia (C.Wright ex Griseb.) J.F.B.Pastore & J.R.Abbott
- Senega stenophylla (A.Gray) J.F.B.Pastore & Agust.Martinez
- Senega stephaniana (Marques) J.F.B.Pastore
- Senega stricta (A.St.-Hil. & Moq.) J.F.B.Pastore
- Senega subalata (S.Watson) J.F.B.Pastore & J.R.Abbott
- Senega subandina (Phil.) J.F.B.Pastore & Agust.Martinez
- Senega subtilis (Kunth) J.F.B.Pastore
- Senega subverticillata (Chodat) J.F.B.Pastore
- Senega suganumae (J.F.B.Pastore & Marques) J.F.B.Pastore
- Senega sulphurea (A.W.Benn.) J.F.B.Pastore
- Senega tacianae (J.F.B.Pastore & Harley) J.F.B.Pastore
- Senega tamariscea (Mart. ex A.W.Benn.) J.F.B.Pastore
- Senega telephium (Chodat) J.F.B.Pastore
- Senega tellezii (T.Wendt) J.F.B.Pastore & J.R.Abbott
- Senega tenuis (DC.) J.F.B.Pastore
- Senega tenuissima (Chodat) J.F.B.Pastore
- Senega timoutoides (Chodat) J.F.B.Pastore
- Senega timoutou (Aubl.) J.F.B.Pastore
- Senega tocantinensis (J.F.B.Pastore & Antar) J.F.B.Pastore
- Senega trichosperma (Jacq.) J.F.B.Pastore
- Senega trifurcata (Chodat) J.F.B.Pastore
- Senega tuberculata (Chodat) J.F.B.Pastore
- Senega veadeiroensis (J.F.B.Pastore) J.F.B.Pastore
- Senega ventanensis (Grondona) J.F.B.Pastore & Agust.Martinez
- Senega vergrandis (W.H.Lewis) J.F.B.Pastore & J.R.Abbott
- Senega verticillata (L.) J.F.B.Pastore & J.R.Abbott
- Senega viridis (S.Watson) J.F.B.Pastore & J.R.Abbott
- Senega vollii (Brade) J.F.B.Pastore
- Senega watsonii (Chodat) J.F.B.Pastore & J.R.Abbott
- Senega weddelliana (Chodat) J.F.B.Pastore
- Senega wettsteinii (Chodat) J.F.B.Pastore
- Senega wilsonii (Small) J.F.B.Pastore & J.R.Abbott
- Senega wurdackiana (W.H.Lewis) J.F.B.Pastore & J.R.Abbott
