= Senega subalata =

Scientific classification
- Kingdom: Plantae
- Clade: Embryophytes
- Clade: Tracheophytes
- Clade: Spermatophytes
- Clade: Angiosperms
- Clade: Eudicots
- Clade: Rosids
- Order: Fabales
- Family: Polygalaceae
- Genus: Senega
- Species: S. subalata

Binomial name
- Senega subalata (S.Watson) J.F.B.Pastore & J.R.Abbott

Synonyms
- Polygala subalata S.Watson; Polygala verticillata Sessé & Moc.

Species of flowering plant

Senega subalata is a flowering plant species in the genus Senega and the family Polygalaceae. It grows in Mexico.
