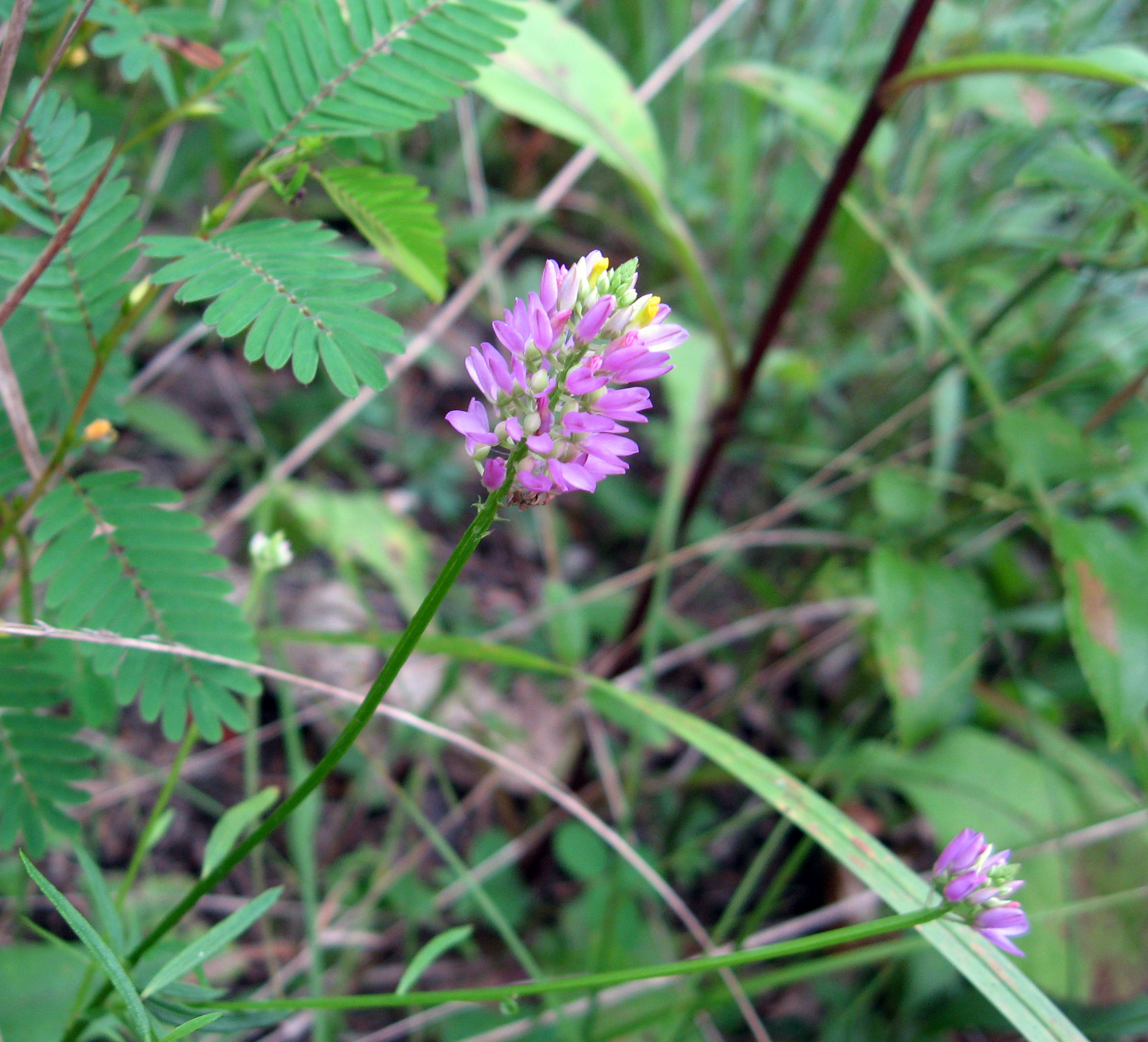

Scientific classification
- Kingdom: Plantae
- Clade: Tracheophytes
- Clade: Angiosperms
- Clade: Eudicots
- Clade: Rosids
- Order: Fabales
- Family: Polygalaceae
- Genus: Senega
- Species: S. curtissii

Binomial name
- Senega curtissii (A.Gray) J.F.B.Pastore & J.R.Abbott

Synonyms
- Polygala curtissii A.Gray; Polygala hugeri Small

= Senega curtissii =

Species of flowering plant

Senega curtissii, commonly known as Curtiss' milkwort or Appalachian milkwort, is a species of flowering plant in the milkwort family. It is native to the Southeastern United States, where it is found primarily in the southern Appalachian Mountains and the Piedmont. Its natural habitat is open, sandy meadows, and woodlands.

It is an annual that produces pink-purple flowers in the summer.
