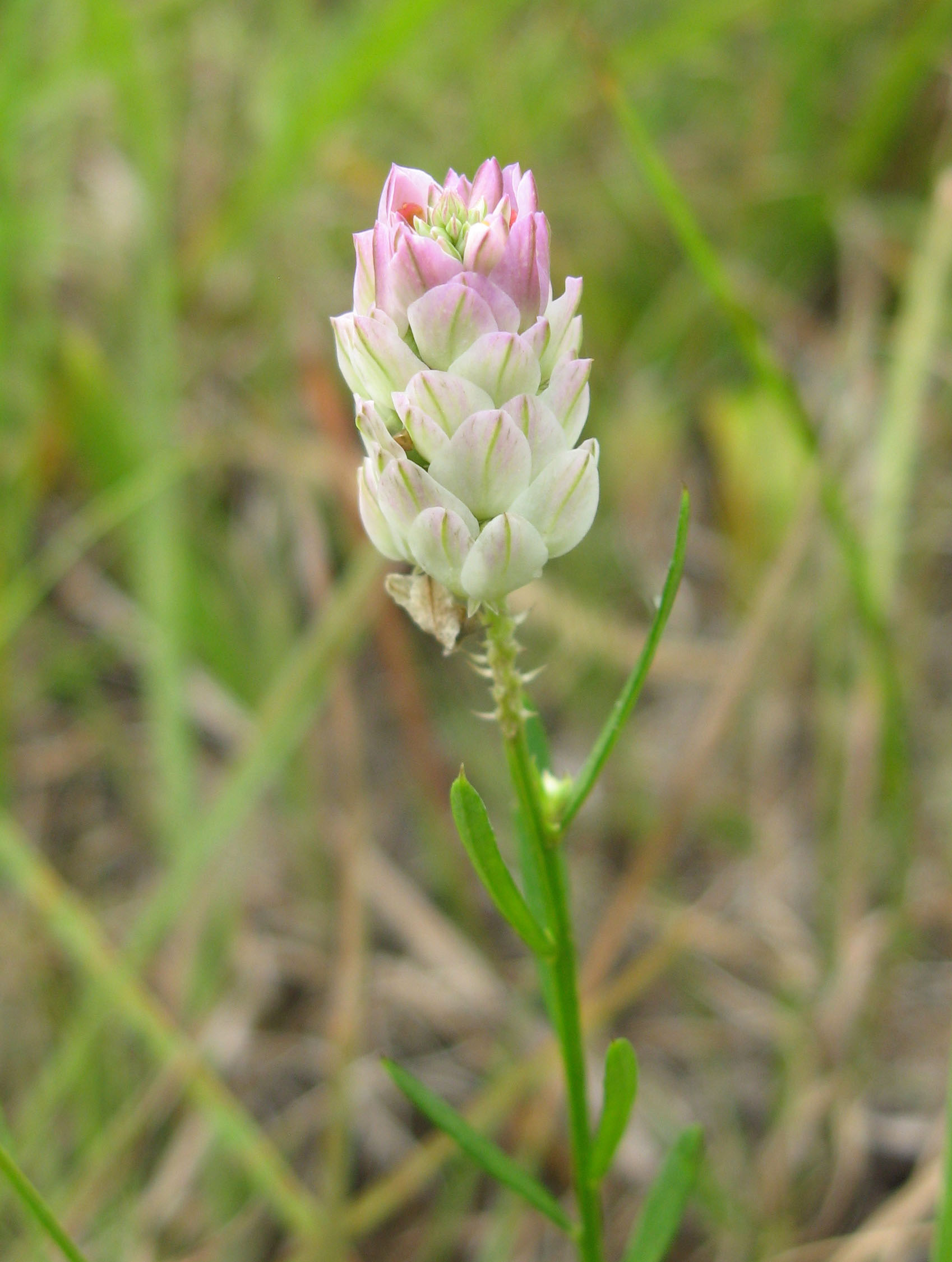

Conservation status
- Secure (NatureServe)

Scientific classification
- Kingdom: Plantae
- Clade: Embryophytes
- Clade: Tracheophytes
- Clade: Spermatophytes
- Clade: Angiosperms
- Clade: Eudicots
- Clade: Rosids
- Order: Fabales
- Family: Polygalaceae
- Genus: Senega
- Species: S. sanguinea

Binomial name
- Senega sanguinea *L.) J.F.B.Pastore & J.R.Abbott

Synonyms
- Polygala sanguinea L.; Polygala nuttalliana F.Dietr.; Polygala purpurea Nutt.; Polygala viridescens L.

= Senega sanguinea =

Species of flowering plant

Senega sanguinea, commonly known as purple milkwort, field milkwort, or blood milkwort is an annual species of plant in the milkwort family (Polygalaceae). It is native to central and eastern North America.

== Description ==
S. sanguinea grows to a height of 10–30 centimetres (4–12 in). The plant has a single, generally unbranched, hairless stem that terminates in a spike-like dense raceme of flowers that is approximately 3 centimetres (1 in) long and 1.3 centimetres (.5 in) across. The flowers are pink, green, or occasionally white. After blooming, the flowers are replaced by 2 hairy seeds within a capsule. The leaves are widely spaced along the stem, alternate, and linear or narrowly elliptical. When crushed, the root of the plant smells of wintergreen.

== Distribution and habitat ==
The plant is native to widespread areas of eastern North America. It is native in the United States from New Mexico to the west, the Canadian border to the north, Texas to the south, and the coast to the east (except in Florida). In Canada, it is native in Ontario, Quebec, New Brunswick, Nova Scotia, and Prince Edward Island.

S. sanguinea is it generally found in wet, acidic soils in open areas such as prairies and fields.

== Ecology ==
Flowers bloom from May to October. Small to medium-sized bees and bee flies are attracted to the pollen and nectar.
