= Senega spicata =

Scientific classification
- Kingdom: Plantae
- Clade: Embryophytes
- Clade: Tracheophytes
- Clade: Spermatophytes
- Clade: Angiosperms
- Clade: Eudicots
- Clade: Rosids
- Order: Fabales
- Family: Polygalaceae
- Genus: Senega
- Species: S. spicata

Binomial name
- Senega spicata (Chodat) J.F.B.Pastore

Synonyms
- Polygala spicata Chodat; Polygala capillaris var. angolensis Oliv.; Polygala schlechteri Schinz

Species of flowering plant

Senega spicata is a species in the family Polygalaceae. It is native to several countries in Africa.
