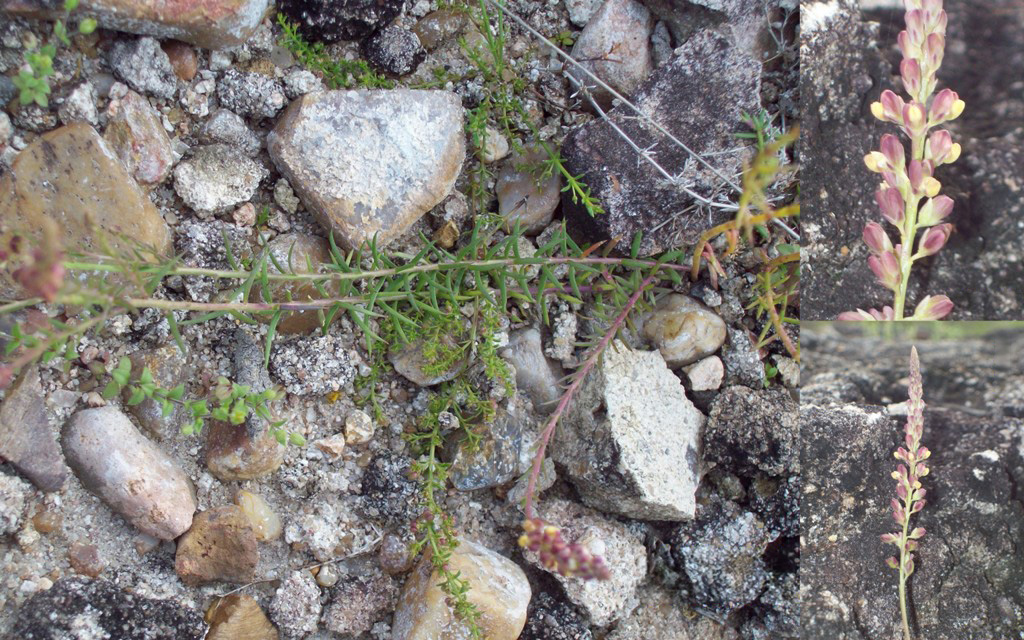
- Growing amongst rocks in Palmar, Soriano Department of Uruguay

Scientific classification
- Kingdom: Plantae
- Clade: Embryophytes
- Clade: Tracheophytes
- Clade: Spermatophytes
- Clade: Angiosperms
- Clade: Eudicots
- Clade: Rosids
- Order: Fabales
- Family: Polygalaceae
- Genus: Senega
- Species: S. bonariensis

Binomial name
- Senega bonariensis (Grondona) J.F.B.Pastore

Synonyms
- Polygala bonariensis Grondona

= Senega bonariensis =

Species of flowering plant

Senega bonariensis is a flowering plant in the genus Senega and Polygalaceae family. It grows in Brazil, Uruguay, and northeastern Argentina.
