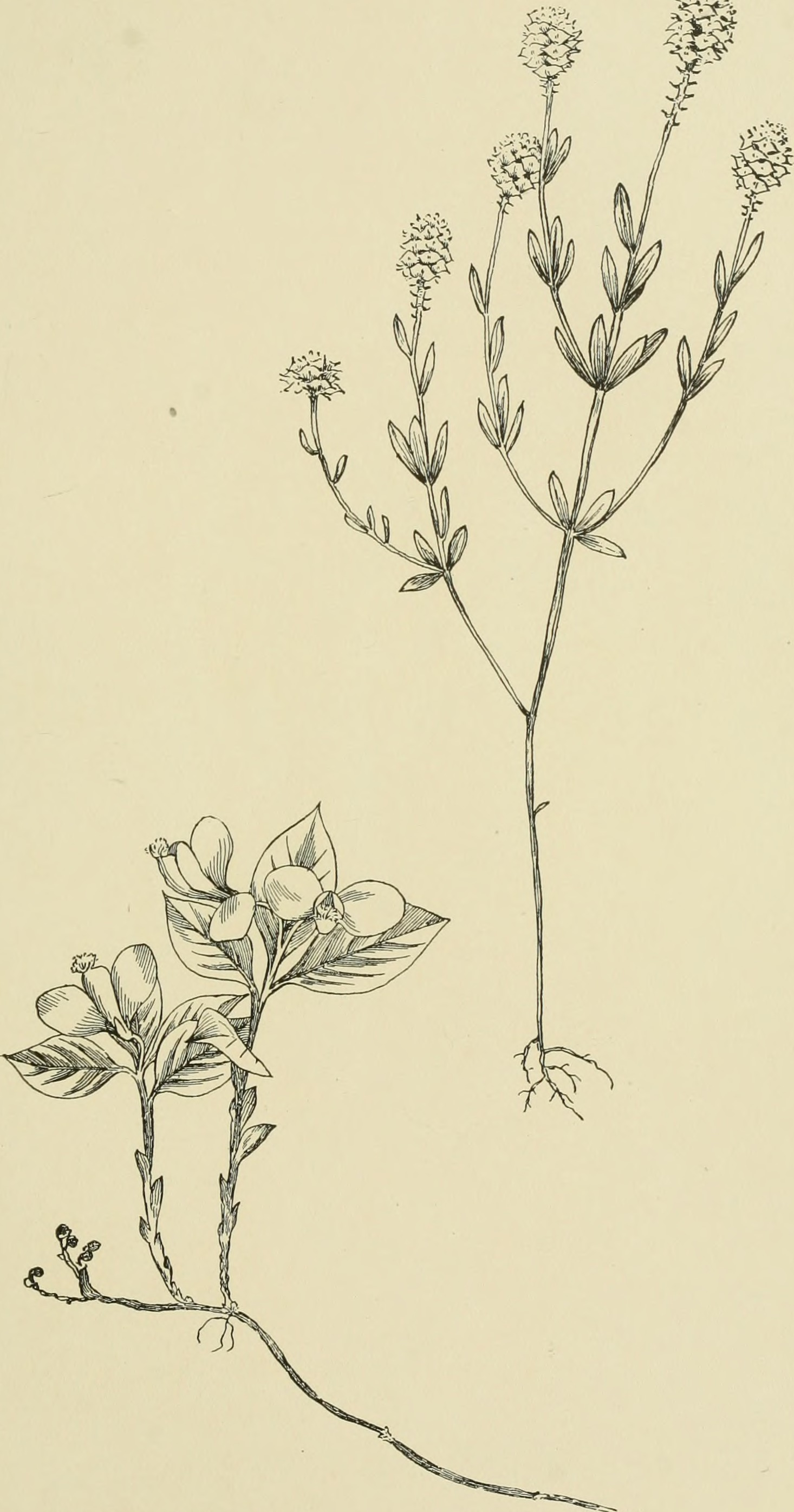
- Illustrations of Senega brevifolia top and Chamaebuxus paucifolia bottom

Conservation status
- Apparently Secure (NatureServe)

Scientific classification
- Kingdom: Plantae
- Clade: Embryophytes
- Clade: Tracheophytes
- Clade: Spermatophytes
- Clade: Angiosperms
- Clade: Eudicots
- Clade: Rosids
- Order: Fabales
- Family: Polygalaceae
- Genus: Senega
- Species: S. brevifolia

Binomial name
- Senega brevifolia (Nutt.) J.F.B.Pastore & J.R.Abbott

Synonyms
- Polygala brevifolia Nutt.

= Senega brevifolia =

Species of flowering plant

Senega brevifolia, common names including littleleaf milkwort and shortleaf milkwort, is a flowering plant in the genus Senega and the family Polygalaceae. It was first described in 1818 as Polygala brevifolia. An annual, it grows in sections of the eastern and southeastern United States.

Its flowers are light rose-purple. The Florida Plant Atlas describes the flowers as "white with a yellow center, the bracts lavender."
