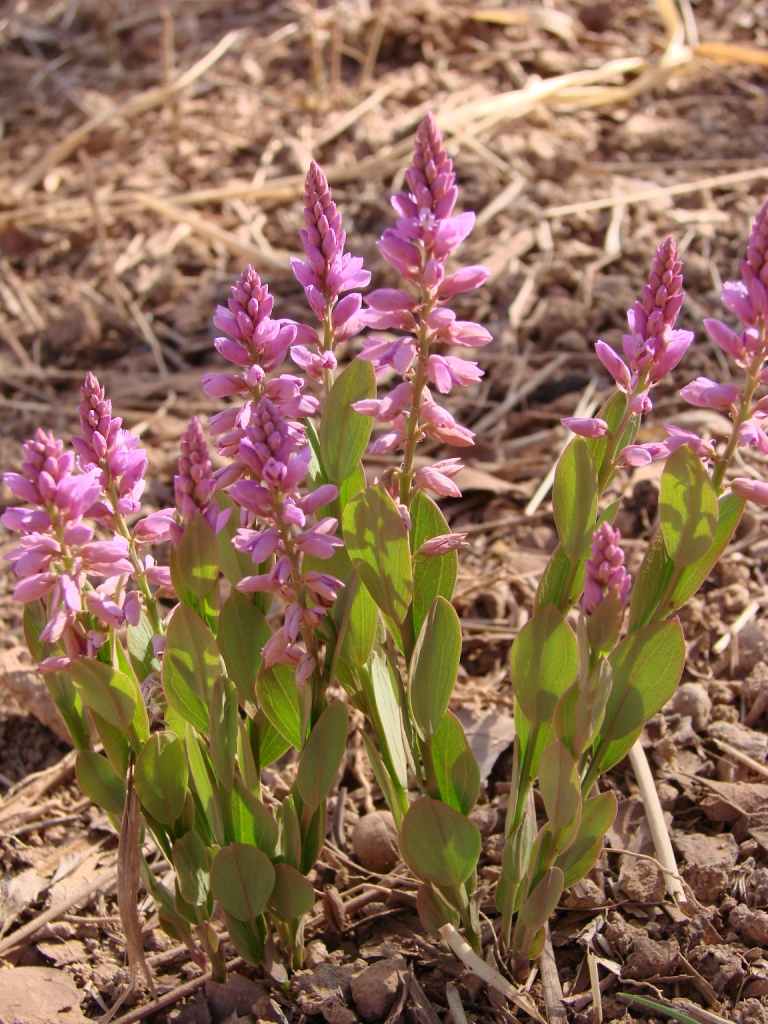

Scientific classification
- Kingdom: Plantae
- Clade: Embryophytes
- Clade: Tracheophytes
- Clade: Spermatophytes
- Clade: Angiosperms
- Clade: Eudicots
- Clade: Rosids
- Order: Fabales
- Family: Polygalaceae
- Genus: Senega
- Species: S. poaya

Binomial name
- Senega poaya (Mart.) J.F.B.Pastore

Synonyms
- Polygala poaya Mart.; Polygala angulata DC.

= Senega poaya =

Species of flowering plant

Senega poaya is a herbaceous species of plant native to South America. It is a perennial plant, becoming somewhat woody at the base. It grows to a clump of stems 8–50 cm tall. The root is sometimes used for local medicinal use. It is also an active emetic.
