= Senega filicaulis =

Scientific classification
- Kingdom: Plantae
- Clade: Embryophytes
- Clade: Tracheophytes
- Clade: Spermatophytes
- Clade: Angiosperms
- Clade: Eudicots
- Clade: Rosids
- Order: Fabales
- Family: Polygalaceae
- Genus: Senega
- Species: S. filicaulis

Binomial name
- Senega filicaulis (Baill.) J.F.B.Pastore

Synonyms
- Polygala filicaulis Baill.

Species of flowering plant

Senega filicaulis is a species of plant in the family Polygalaceae. It is endemic to coastal swamps in Madagascar at altitudes below 1,000 metres (3,300 ft) . It is an annual herb that has a height of up to 40 centimetres (16 in) and produces small, purplish flowers.
