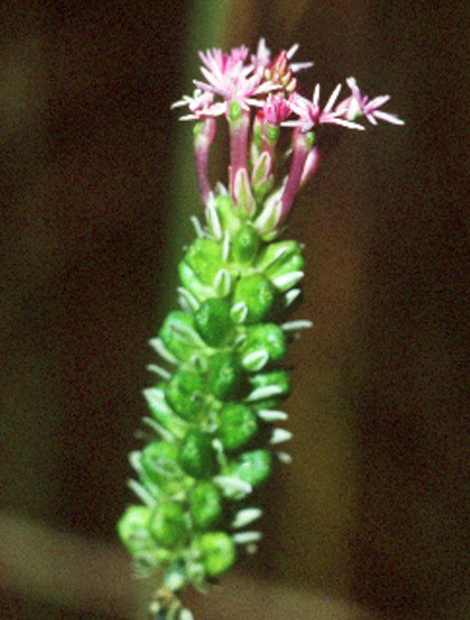

Conservation status
- Secure (NatureServe)

Scientific classification
- Kingdom: Plantae
- Clade: Embryophytes
- Clade: Tracheophytes
- Clade: Spermatophytes
- Clade: Angiosperms
- Clade: Eudicots
- Clade: Rosids
- Order: Fabales
- Family: Polygalaceae
- Genus: Senega
- Species: S. incarnata

Binomial name
- Senega incarnata L. J.F.B.Pastore & J.R.Abbott

Synonyms
- Galypola incarnata (L.) Nieuwl.; Polygala incarnata L.; Polygala microptera A.W.Benn.; Polygala paniculata Leconte

= Senega incarnata =

Species of flowering plant

Senega incarnata, commonly known as procession flower or pink milkwort, is a species of annual flower in the genus Senega and Polygalaceae family. It is found in North America.

== Description ==
Senega incarnata may reach a height of up to 2 ft (60 cm). The leaves are whorled or alternately arranged and are linear in shape. They range in length between 5 and 17 mm (0.20 and 0.67 in).

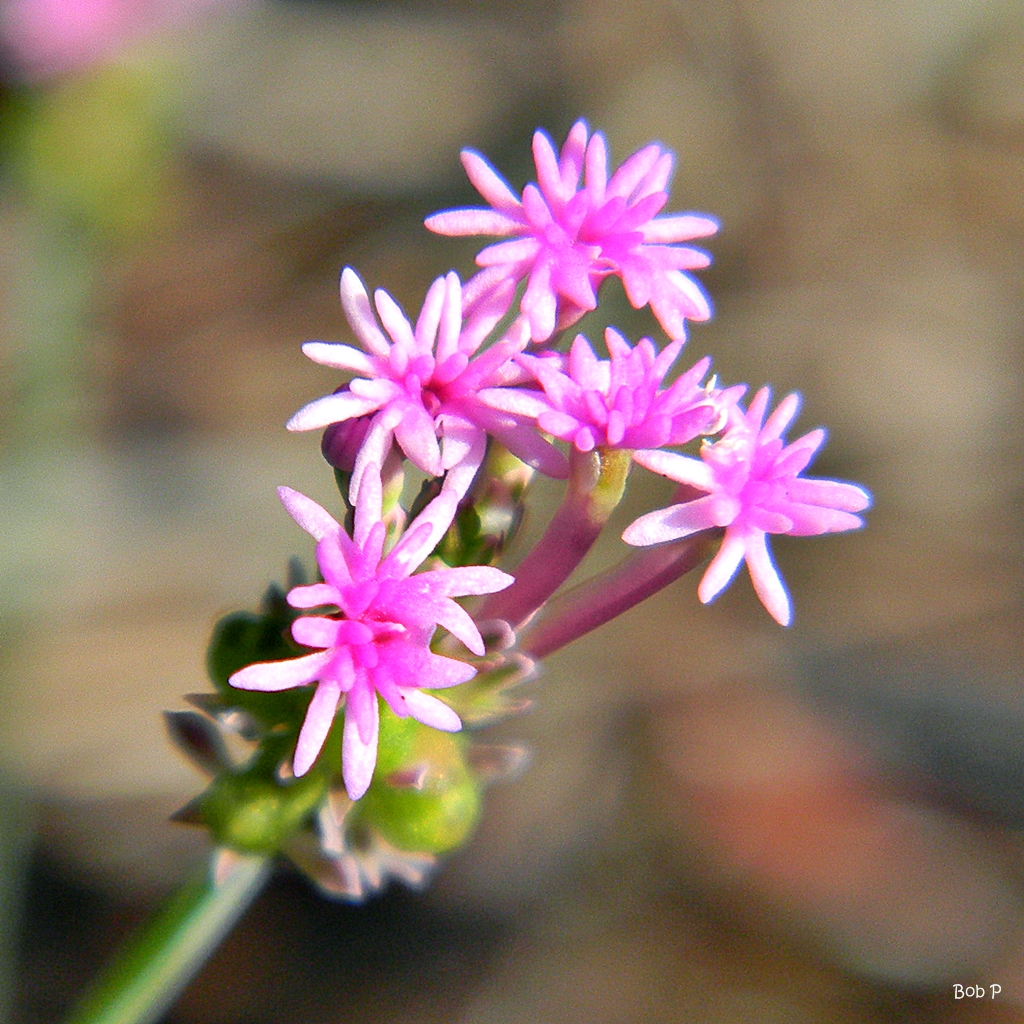
Closeup

Flowers occur in spikes or racemes, with small petals that are pink in color. The corolla tube is 5 to 6.5 mm (0.20 to 0.26 in) in length and prominently fringed. The seeds are black and range in length from 1 to 1.7 mm (0.04 to 0.07 in).

P. incarnata flowers from spring into the late summer.

== Distribution and habitat ==
This species may be found throughout the eastern half of the United States into Ontario, Canada. Its range within the United States stretches from New York south to Florida and westward to Texas, Oklahoma, and Kansas. P. incarnata is also found in Mexico and Central America, as far south as Nicaragua.

Within its range, Senega incarnata can be found in habitat types such as prairies, woodlands, pine savannas, and glades. It does best in dry, sandy soils with high levels of sun.
