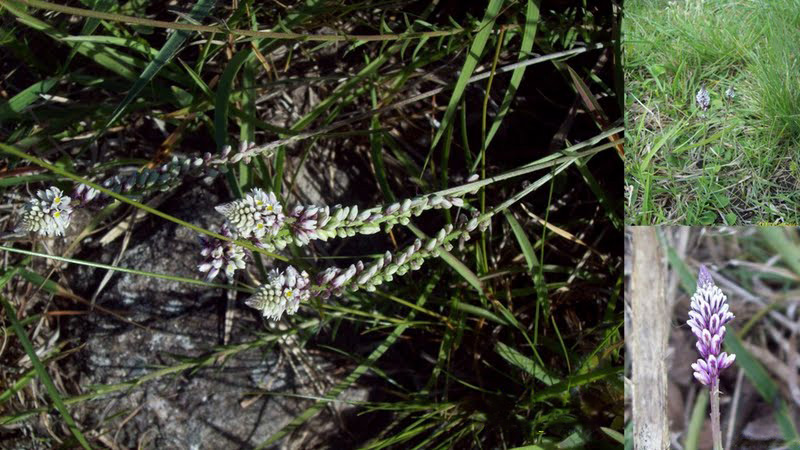
- In the Soriano Department of Uruguay

Scientific classification
- Kingdom: Plantae
- Clade: Embryophytes
- Clade: Tracheophytes
- Clade: Spermatophytes
- Clade: Angiosperms
- Clade: Eudicots
- Clade: Rosids
- Order: Fabales
- Family: Polygalaceae
- Genus: Senega
- Species: S. linoides

Binomial name
- Senega linoides (Poir.) J.F.B.Pastore

Synonyms
- Polygala linoides Poir.; Polygala foliosa A.St.-Hil. & Moq.; Polygala linoides var. ambigua Beauverd & Felipp.; Polygala linoides var. latifolia Chodat; Polygala marplatensis Grondona

= Senega linoides =

Flowering plant in Brazil

Senega linoides is a flowering plant in the Senega genus and Polygalaceae family. It grows in southern Brazil and northeastern Argentina. Its appearance is similar to Senega resedoides.

The National Museum of Natural History has photographs of a specimen collected in 1957.
