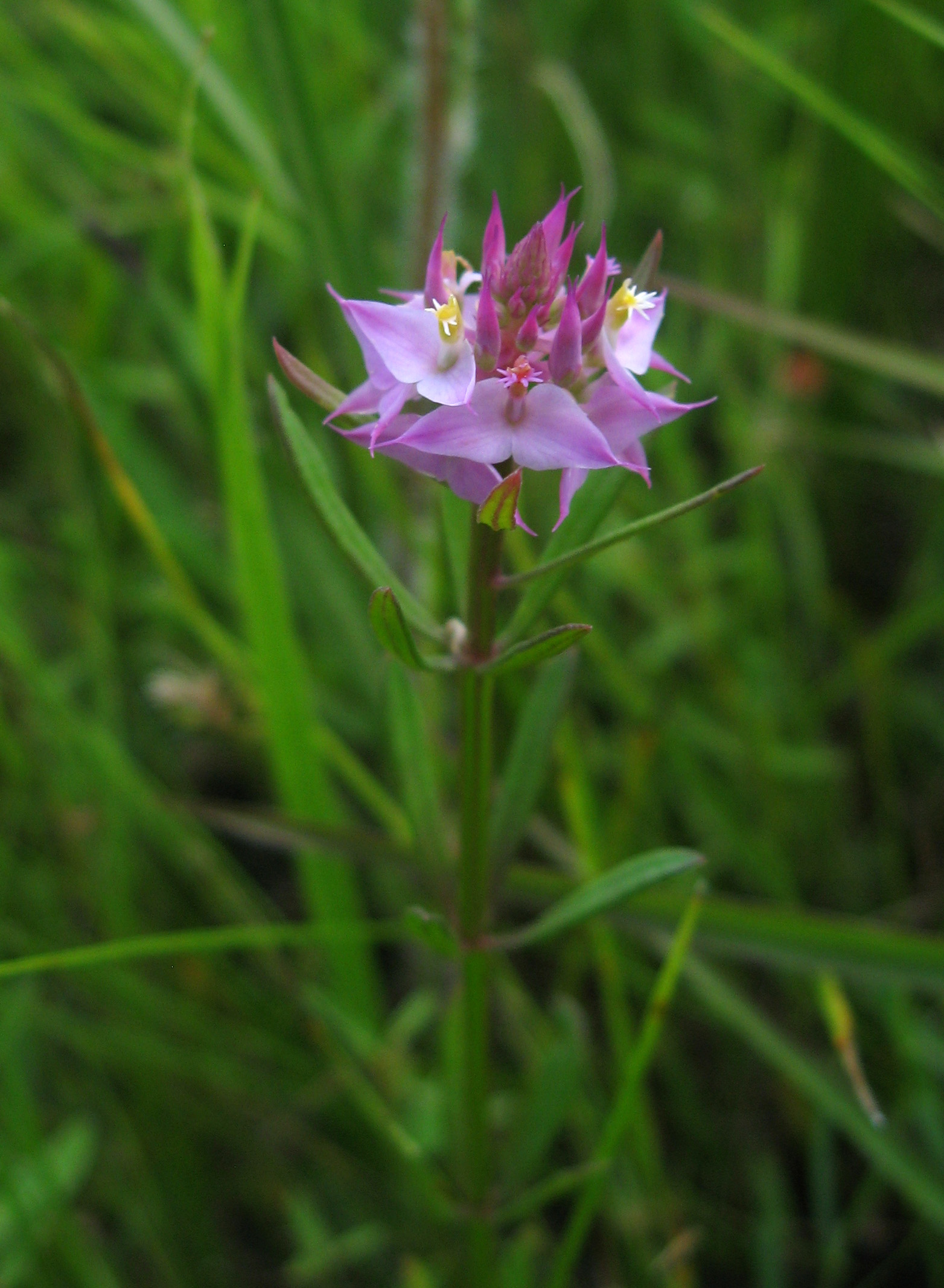

Scientific classification
- Kingdom: Plantae
- Clade: Embryophytes
- Clade: Tracheophytes
- Clade: Spermatophytes
- Clade: Angiosperms
- Clade: Eudicots
- Clade: Rosids
- Order: Fabales
- Family: Polygalaceae
- Genus: Senega
- Species: S. cruciata

Binomial name
- Senega cruciata (L.) J.F.B.Pastore & J.R.Abbott

Synonyms
- Polygala cruciata L.; Polygala cuspidata Hook. & Arn.; Polygala ramosior (Nash ex B.L.Rob. & A.Gray) Small

= Senega cruciata =

Species of flowering plant

Senega cruciata, commonly called drumheads milkwort, is a species of flowering plant in the milkwort family. It is native to eastern North America, where it is found in scattered localities, particularly around the Coastal Plain, the Great Lakes, and the southern Appalachian Mountains. It is found most often in wet, sandy prairies and marshes.

It is an annual that produces pink-purple flowers in the summer.
