= Senega setacea =

Scientific classification
- Kingdom: Plantae
- Clade: Tracheophytes
- Clade: Angiosperms
- Clade: Eudicots
- Clade: Rosids
- Order: Fabales
- Family: Polygalaceae
- Genus: Senega
- Species: S. setacea

Binomial name
- Senega setacea (Michx.) J.F.B.Pastore & J.R.Abbott

Synonyms
- Polygala setacea Michx.

Species of flowering plant

Senega setacea, commonly known as coastal plain milkwort, is a species of flowering plant native to the south-eastern United States. A perennial, it lives for about three years and may not flower its first year. It has scale-like leaves and white flowers. It grows in flatwoods.
