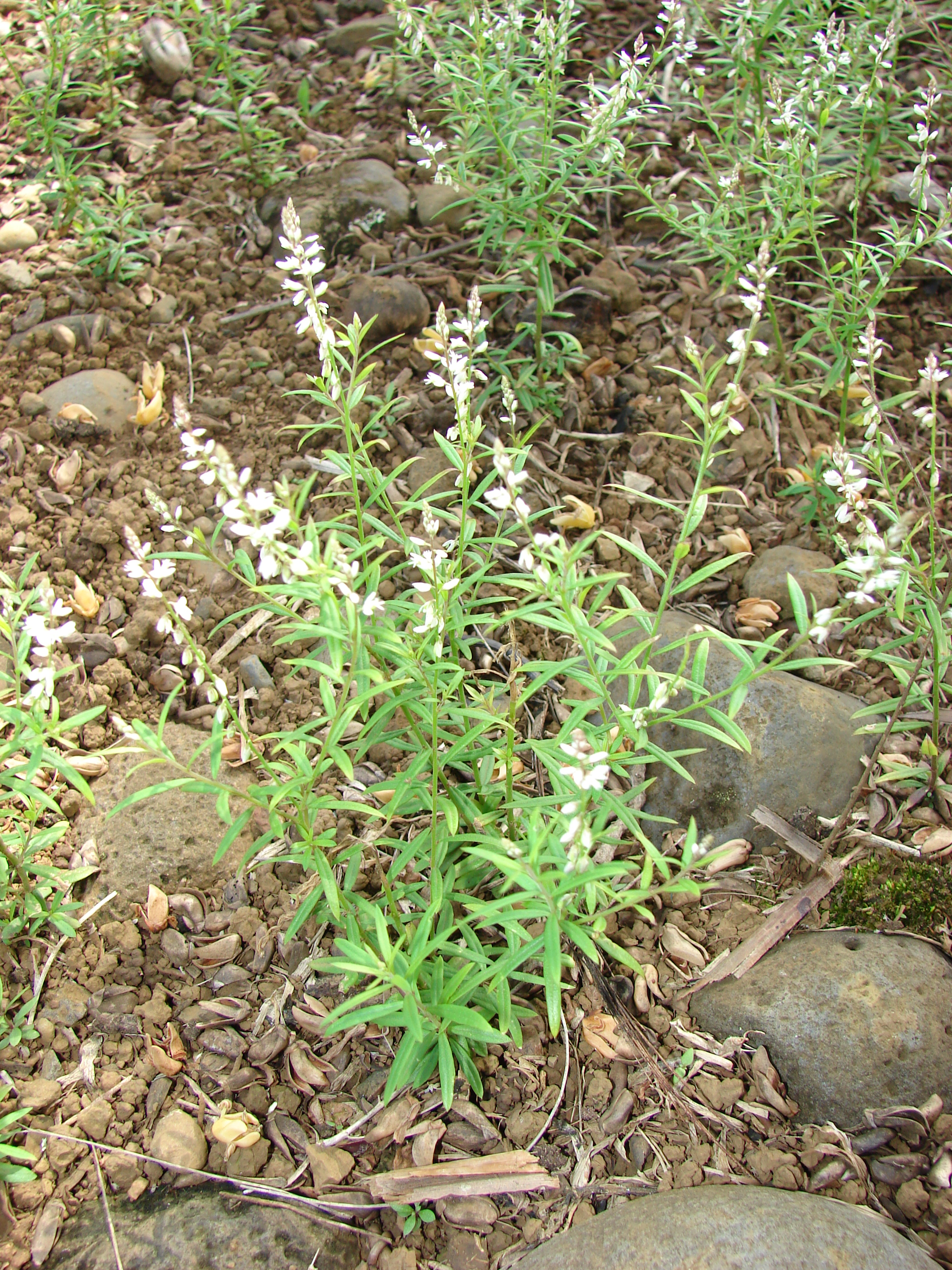

Conservation status
- Secure (NatureServe)

Scientific classification
- Kingdom: Plantae
- Clade: Embryophytes
- Clade: Tracheophytes
- Clade: Angiosperms
- Clade: Eudicots
- Clade: Rosids
- Order: Fabales
- Family: Polygalaceae
- Genus: Senega
- Species: S. paniculata

Binomial name
- Senega paniculata (L.) J.F.B.Pastore & J.R.Abbott

Synonyms
- List: Polygala paniculata L.; Polygala amaniensis Gürke ex Chodat; Polygala brasiliensis Mart.; Polygala caripensis Turcz.; Polygala humilis Vell.; Polygala ramosissima Cav.; Polygala tenella Willd.

= Senega paniculata =

Species of flowering plant

Senega paniculata is a species of flowering plant in the milkwort family (Polygalaceae). It is native to grasslands with altitudes between 350 and 1,700 metres (1,150 and 5,580 ft). It is native to Central and South America and has been introduced to East Africa, South Asia, and Southeast Asia. It is an annual herb which has a height between 15 and 50 centimetres (5.9 and 19.7 in) It is used as a medicine against snake bites and blenorrhagias. The flowers of the plant have been described as pink or white.
