= Senega crenata =

Scientific classification
- Kingdom: Plantae
- Clade: Embryophytes
- Clade: Tracheophytes
- Clade: Spermatophytes
- Clade: Angiosperms
- Clade: Eudicots
- Clade: Rosids
- Order: Fabales
- Family: Polygalaceae
- Genus: Senega
- Species: S. crenata

Binomial name
- Senega crenata (C.W.James) J.F.B.Pastore & J.R.Abbott

Synonyms
- Polygala crenata C.W.James; Polygala polygama f. obovata S.F.Blake

Species of flowering plant

Senega crenata (common name scalloped milkwort) is a species of flowering plant in the family Polygalaceae. It grows in Texas and the southeastern United States.
