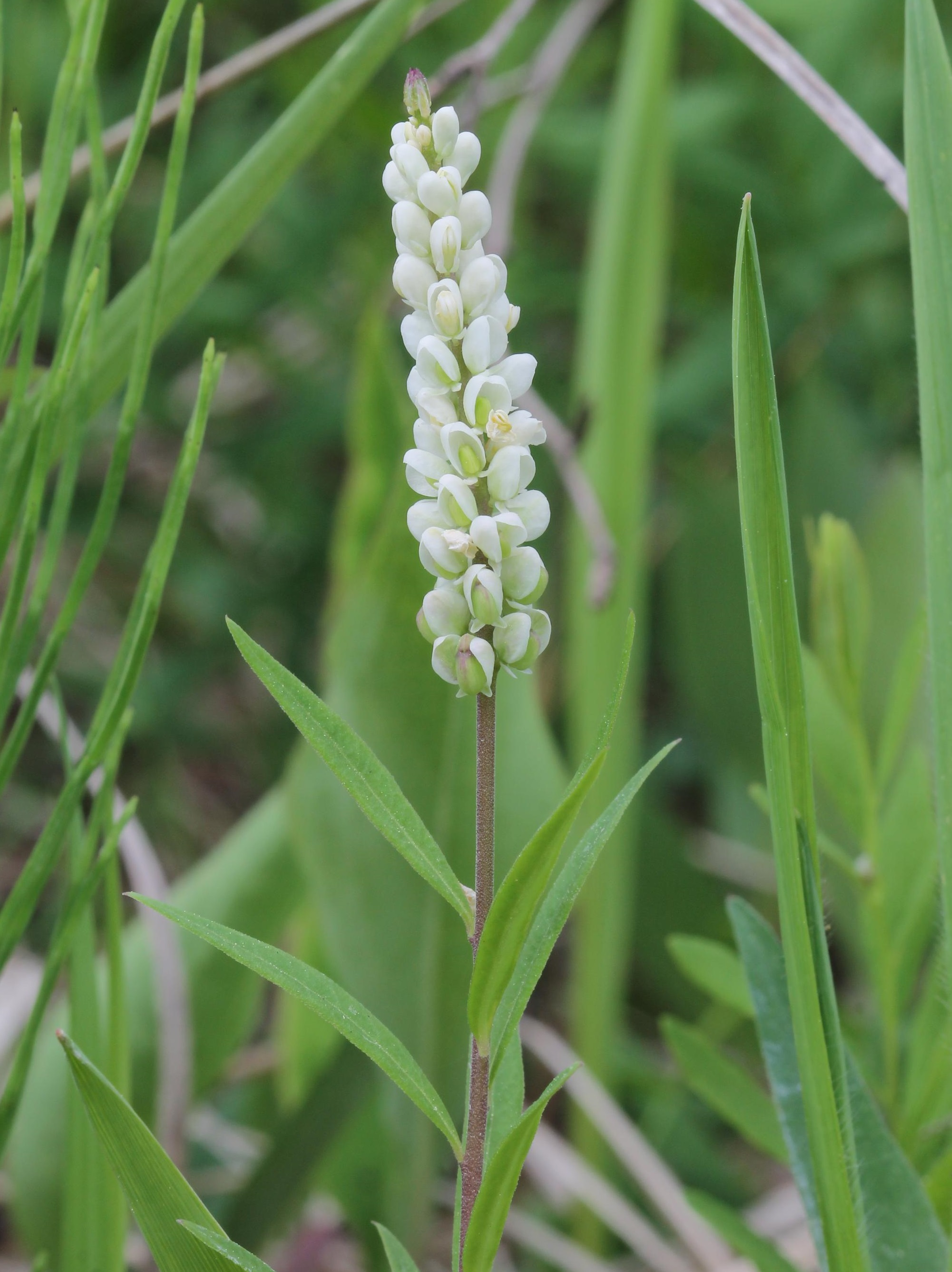

Conservation status
- Apparently Secure (NatureServe)

Scientific classification
- Kingdom: Plantae
- Clade: Embryophytes
- Clade: Tracheophytes
- Clade: Spermatophytes
- Clade: Angiosperms
- Clade: Eudicots
- Clade: Rosids
- Order: Fabales
- Family: Polygalaceae
- Genus: Senega
- Species: S. officinalis

Binomial name
- Senega officinalis Spach

Synonyms
- List: Polygala senega L.; Polygala albida Steud.; Polygala lonchophylla Greene; Polygala rosea Steud.; Polygala seneka Hill

= Senega officinalis =

Species of flowering plant

Senega officinalis is a species of flowering plant in the milkwort family, Polygalaceae. It is native to North America, where it is found in southern Canada and the central and eastern United States. Its common names include Seneca snakeroot, senega snakeroot, senegaroot, rattlesnake root, and mountain flax. Its genus name honors the Seneca people, a Native American group who used the plant to treat snakebite.

== Description ==
This species is a perennial herb with multiple stems up to 50 centimeters tall. The stems are usually unbranched, but some old plants can have branching stems. A mature plant can have up to 70 stems growing from a hard, woody rootstock that spreads horizontally. The lance-shaped leaves are alternately arranged. The lower leaves are reduced and scale-like. The inflorescence is a spike of rounded white or greenish flowers. The fruit is a capsule containing two hairy black seeds. The root is twisted and conical, with a scent somewhat like wintergreen and a very pungent taste.

There are two root polymorphisms; a northern morph growing in Canada and toward Minnesota has larger roots up to 15 cm long by 1.2 cm wide which are dark brown and sometimes purplish toward the top, and a southern morph found in the southeastern United States that has smaller, yellow-brown roots.

The plant grows on prairies, in woods, in wet shoreline and riverbank habitat. It grows in thin, rocky, usually calcareous soils. It also occurs in disturbed habitat, such as roadsides.

== Medicinal use ==
This plant had many uses among Native Americans. The Cherokee used it as an expectorant and a diuretic, and for inflammation, croup, and common cold. The Chippewa used preparations of the root to treat convulsions and bleeding wounds. The Cree chewed the root for sore throat and toothache. According to Canadian botanist Frère Marie-Victorin, the Seneca may have been inspired to use the root to treat snakebite by its resemblance to the tail of a rattlesnake.

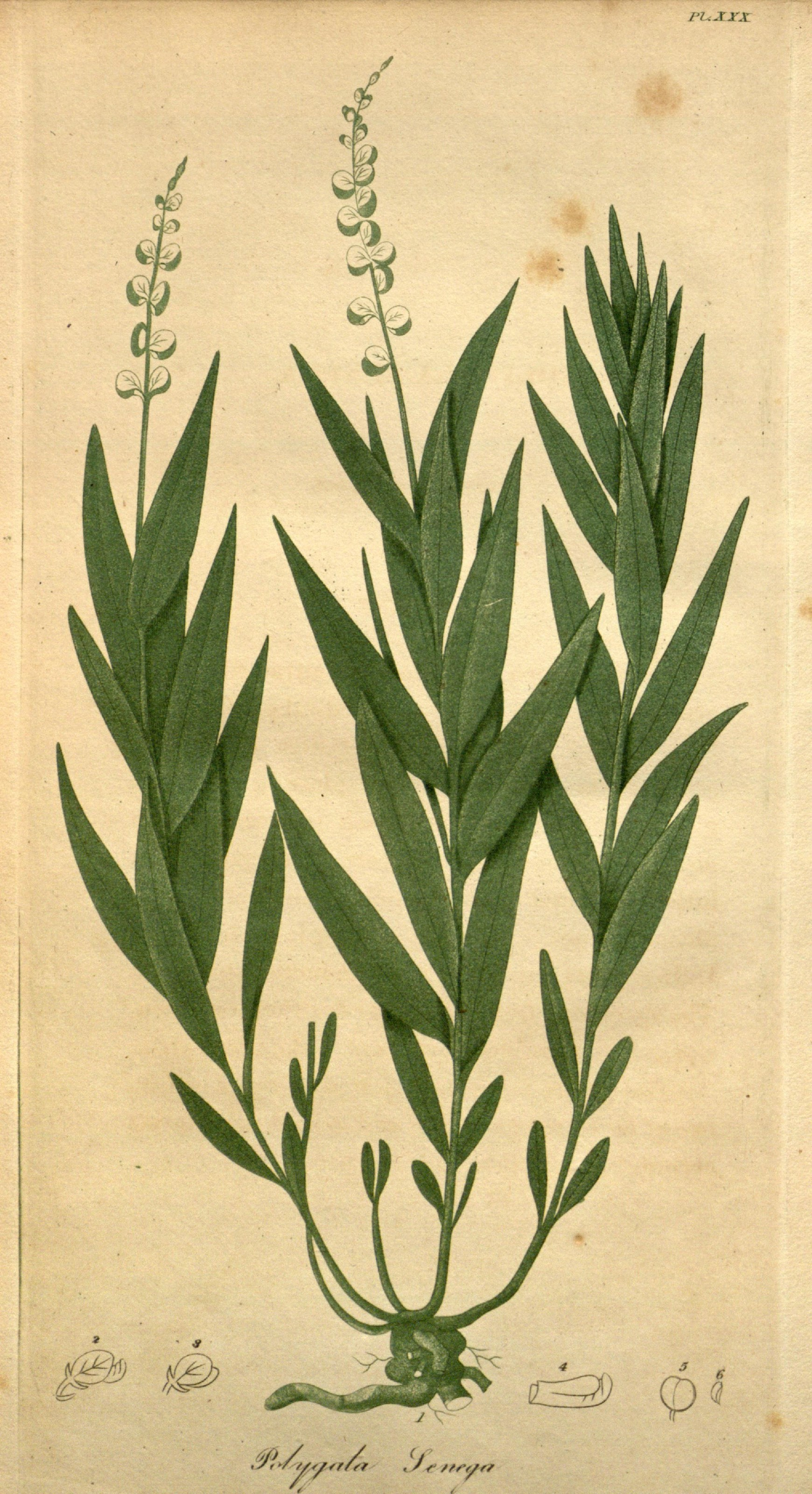
Illustration

The root was exported to Europe in the 1700s and was sold widely by pharmacists into the 1800s. It was marketed as a treatment for pneumonia. It is still in use as an herbal remedy. It is ground and made into patent medicines, mainly remedies for respiratory complaints. It is added to cough syrups, teas, lozenges, and gargles. It is toxic in large amounts, and overdose causes such symptoms as diarrhea and "violent vomiting". The powdered root can be sternutatory (sneeze-inducing).

The root product is called Senegae Radix, Radix Senegae, or simply senega. Active compounds include saponins such as senegin, as well as phenolic acids, sorbitol derivatives, methyl salicylate (oil of wintergreen), and sterols. The expectorant property comes from the irritation of mucous membranes by the saponins, which causes an increase in respiratory secretions and a decrease in their viscosity, giving a productive cough.

== Commercial trade ==
The root is cultivated on a small scale commercially, particularly in Japan, India, and Brazil. Until the 1960s, Canada was the largest exporter of the product, but there the root was collected from the wild. Most came from Saskatchewan and Manitoba. Still wild-harvested, three quarters of the world's supply is taken from the wilds of the Interlake Region of Manitoba. Native peoples provide most of the labor, digging roots and selling them to drug companies.

There is interest in turning the plant into a workable agricultural crop, especially in Canada. Overexploitation of the native plant is a concern, and there has been evidence of overharvest in some areas. At its peak in the year 1931, Canada exported about 781,000 pounds of dry senega root, which equals 2 million pounds of fresh plant. More yet was supplied to the domestic market. Today about 100,000 pounds of fresh plant are harvested annually from the wild in Canada. Herbal remedies are becoming popular again, and demand for senega grows an estimated 5% per year. The biggest importers of the Canadian product, as of the mid-90s, were Europe, Japan, and the United States.

The Cree and Métis people are the main collectors of the wild plant. They reportedly earned US$3.50 per pound of dry root in 1993, and up to US$7.00 per pound in 1998. A government report noted the price was US$6.50-8.00 in 1995. The dry root brought C$28,000 per ton in 1997. In 1999, one company was selling bulk powdered senega for US$18 per pound.

In cultivation the plant can be propagated by seeds or cuttings. The seeds require two months of cold stratification before use. A plant takes 4 years to produce a root large enough to harvest. The roots are dug up, washed, and dried, and about 160 roots yield one kilogram of senega.

== Conservation ==
The plant is distributed widely in Canada and is not considered endangered. In some more pristine and isolated regions the species can be common. In general, it is experiencing a short-term decline of about 10 to 30%. Besides overexploitation, the plant has experienced loss of habitat to overgrazing and the conversion of land to urban and agricultural use.
