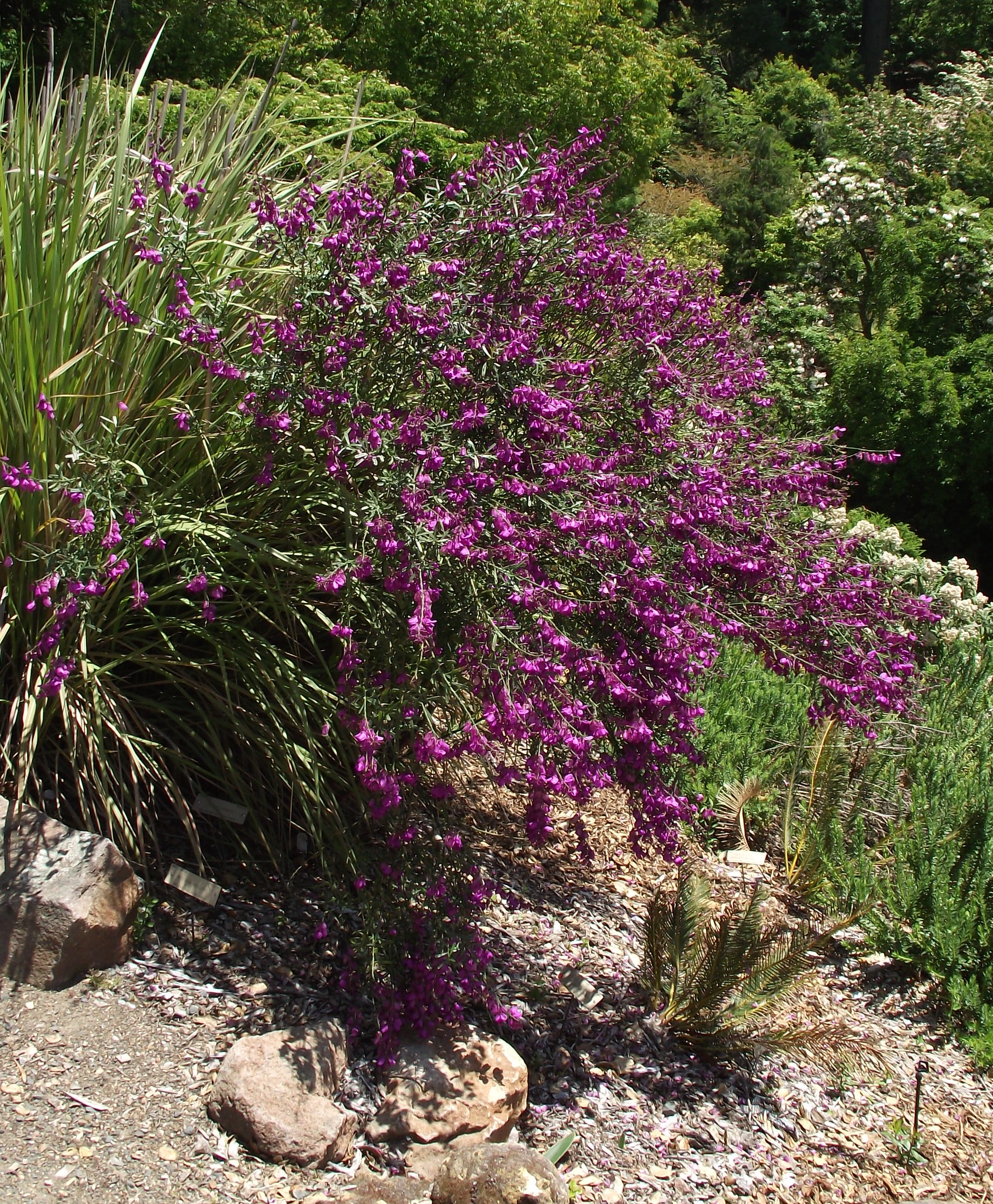
- Polygala lancifolia at the UC Botanical Garden

Scientific classification
- Kingdom: Plantae
- Clade: Embryophytes
- Clade: Tracheophytes
- Clade: Spermatophytes
- Clade: Angiosperms
- Clade: Eudicots
- Clade: Rosids
- Order: Fabales
- Family: Polygalaceae
- Genus: Senega
- Species: S. lancifolia

Binomial name
- Senega lancifolia (A.St.-Hil. & Moq.) J.F.B.Pastore

Synonyms
- Polygala lancifolia A.St.-Hil. & Moq.; Polygala michelii Chodat; Polygala multicaulis Vell.; Polygala virgata Vell.

= Senega lancifolia =

Species of flowering plant

Senega lancifolia is a flowering plant in the Senega genus and Polygalaceae family. It grows in parts of Brazil, Paraguay, and northern Argentina.
