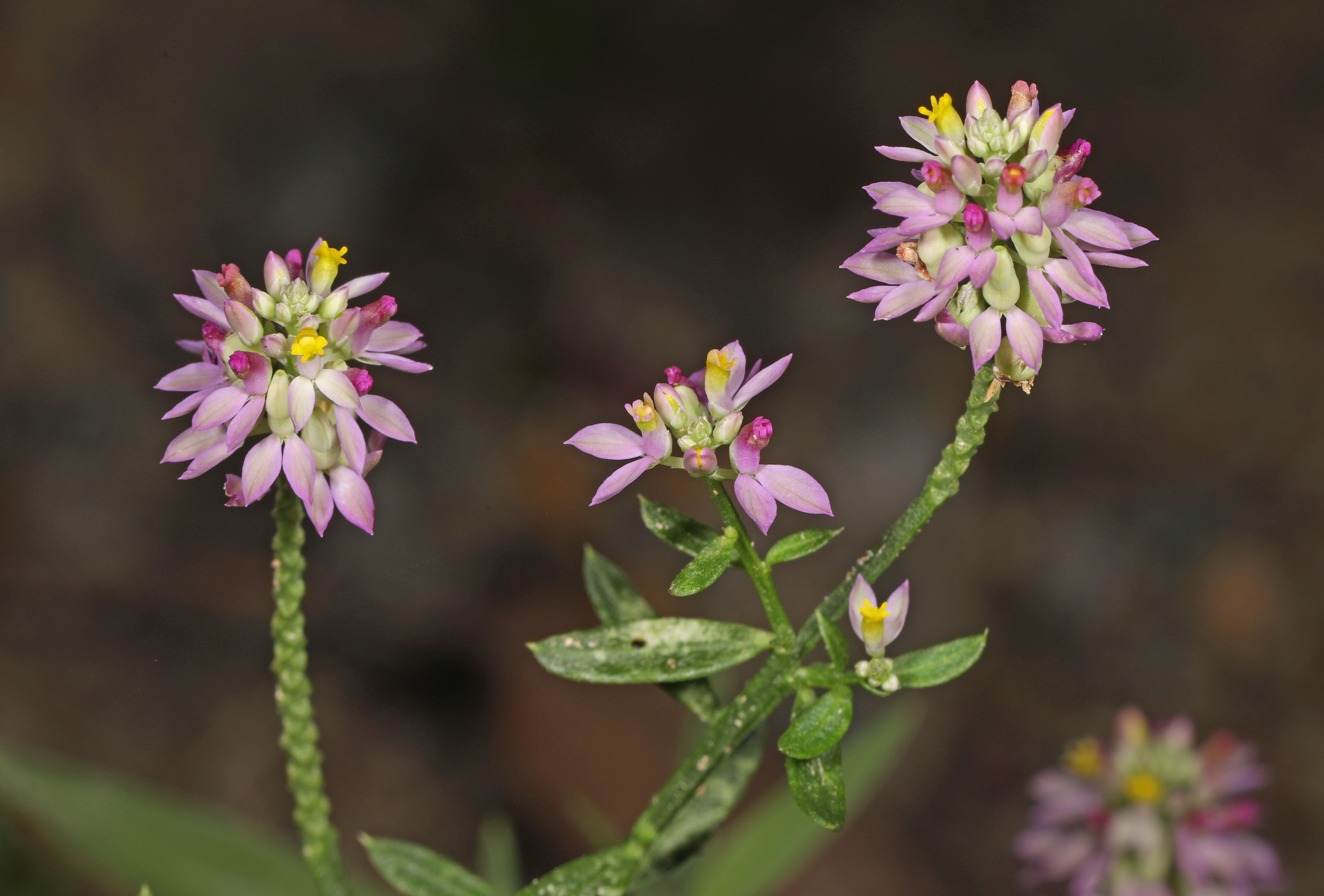

Conservation status
- Secure (NatureServe)

Scientific classification
- Kingdom: Plantae
- Clade: Embryophytes
- Clade: Tracheophytes
- Clade: Spermatophytes
- Clade: Angiosperms
- Clade: Eudicots
- Clade: Rosids
- Order: Fabales
- Family: Polygalaceae
- Genus: Senega
- Species: S. mariana

Binomial name
- Senega mariana (Mill.) J.F.B.Pastore & J.R.Abbott

Synonyms
- Polygala mariana Mill.; Polygala fastigiata Nutt.; Polygala harperi Small

= Senega mariana =

Species of flowering plant

Senega mariana, the Maryland milkwort, is a species of flowering plant in the milkwort family (Polygalaceae). It is endemic to the southern and eastern United States. It is an annual with a height between 4 and 16 inches (10 and 41 cm) and it flowers between June and October.
