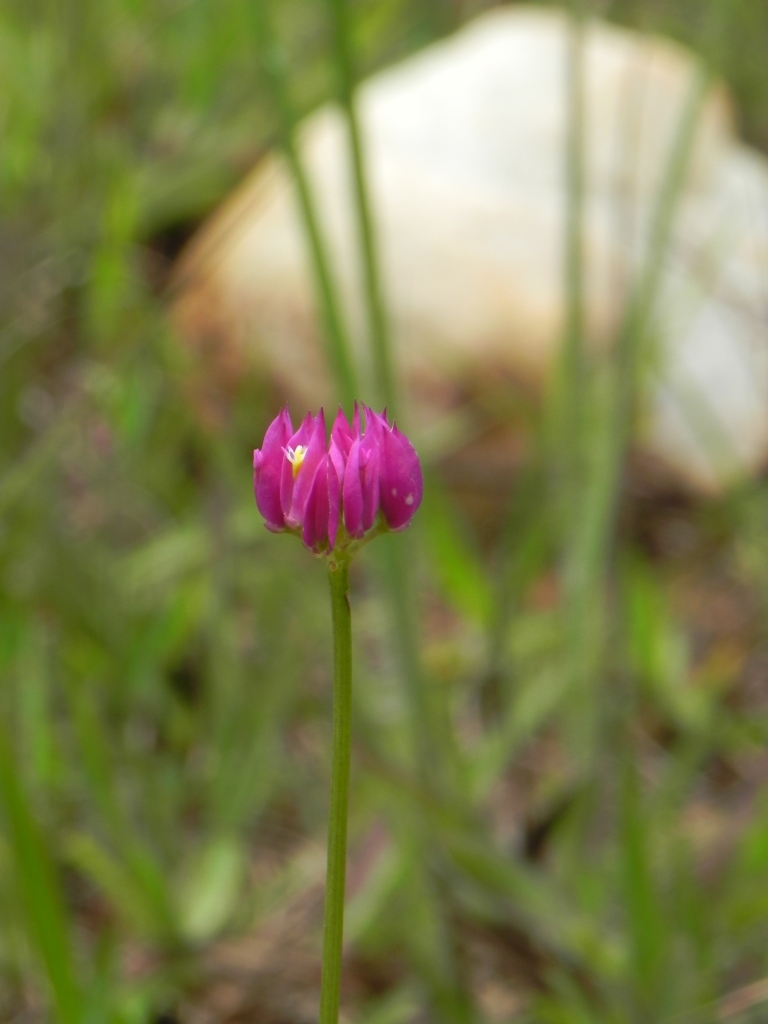

Scientific classification
- Kingdom: Plantae
- Clade: Embryophytes
- Clade: Tracheophytes
- Clade: Spermatophytes
- Clade: Angiosperms
- Clade: Eudicots
- Clade: Rosids
- Order: Fabales
- Family: Polygalaceae
- Genus: Senega
- Species: S. longicaulis

Binomial name
- Senega longicaulis (Kunth) J.F.B.Pastore

Synonyms
- List: Polygala longicaulis Kunth; Polygala adpressa Steud. ex A.Stahl; Polygala brachistachyos Poir.; Polygala capitata Sessé & Moc.; Polygala diversifolia Miq.; Polygala gomphrenoides A.St.-Hil. & Moq.; Polygala stellera DC.

= Senega longicaulis =

Species of flowering plant

Senega longicaulis, the longstem milkwort, is a species of flowering plant in the milkwort family (Polygalaceae). An annual dicot, it is native to the Americas.
