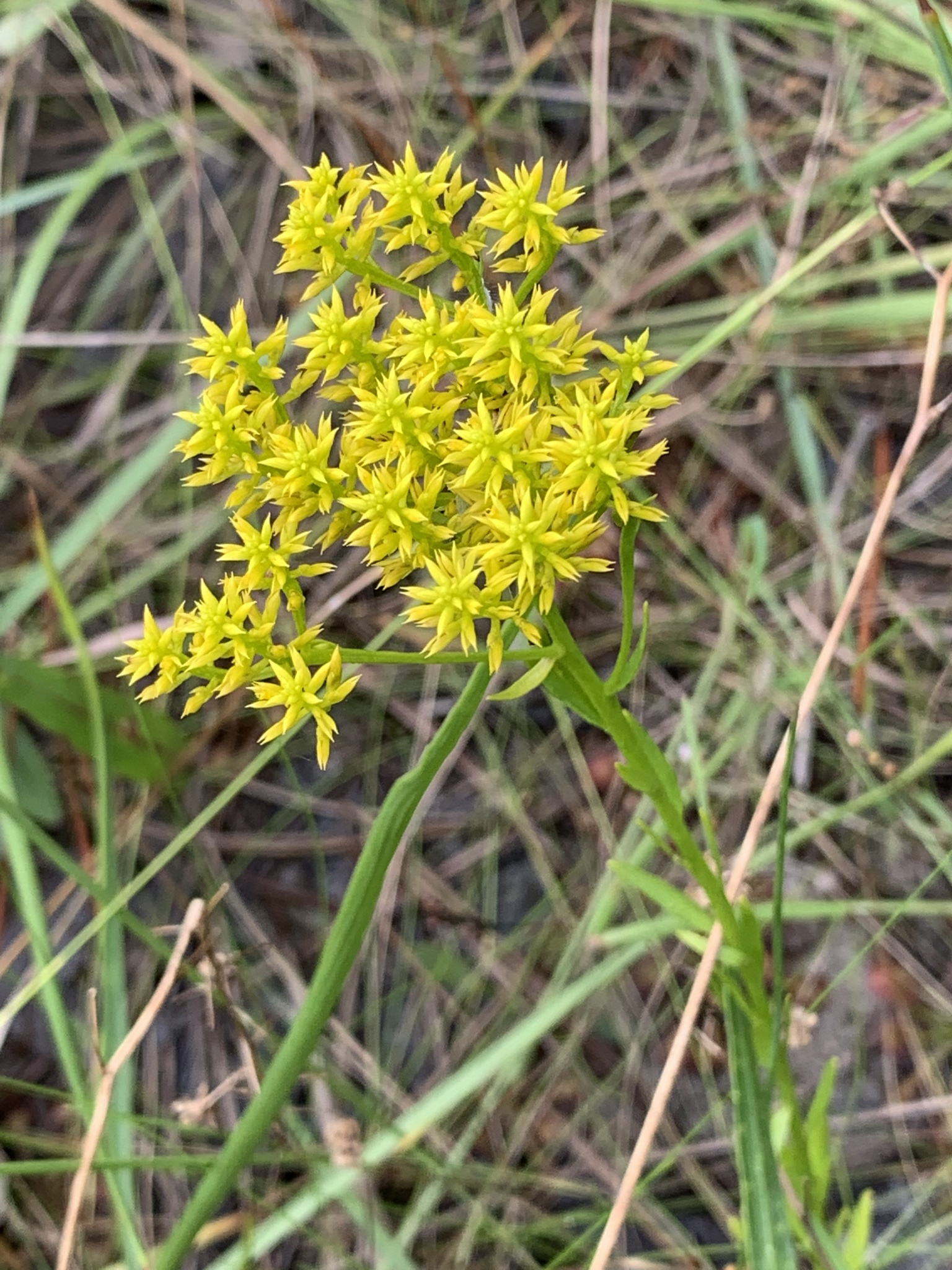

Conservation status
- Secure (NatureServe)

Scientific classification
- Kingdom: Plantae
- Clade: Embryophytes
- Clade: Tracheophytes
- Clade: Spermatophytes
- Clade: Angiosperms
- Clade: Eudicots
- Clade: Rosids
- Order: Fabales
- Family: Polygalaceae
- Genus: Senega
- Species: S. ramosa

Binomial name
- Senega ramosa (Elliott) J.F.B.Pastore & J.R.Abbott

Synonyms
- List: Pilostaxis ramosa (Elliott) Small; Polygala ramosa Elliott; Polygala balduini var. chlorogena Torr. & A.Gray; Polygala corymbosa Nutt.

= Senega ramosa =

Species of flowering plant

Senega ramosa (commonly known as low pinebarren milkwort or short pinebarren milkwort) is a species of flowering plant in the milkwort family (Polygalaceae). It is endemic to the coastal areas of the southern and eastern United States. It is an annual herb with a height of 10 to 40 centimetres (3.9 to 15.7 in) that produces yellow flowers between the months of May and September.
