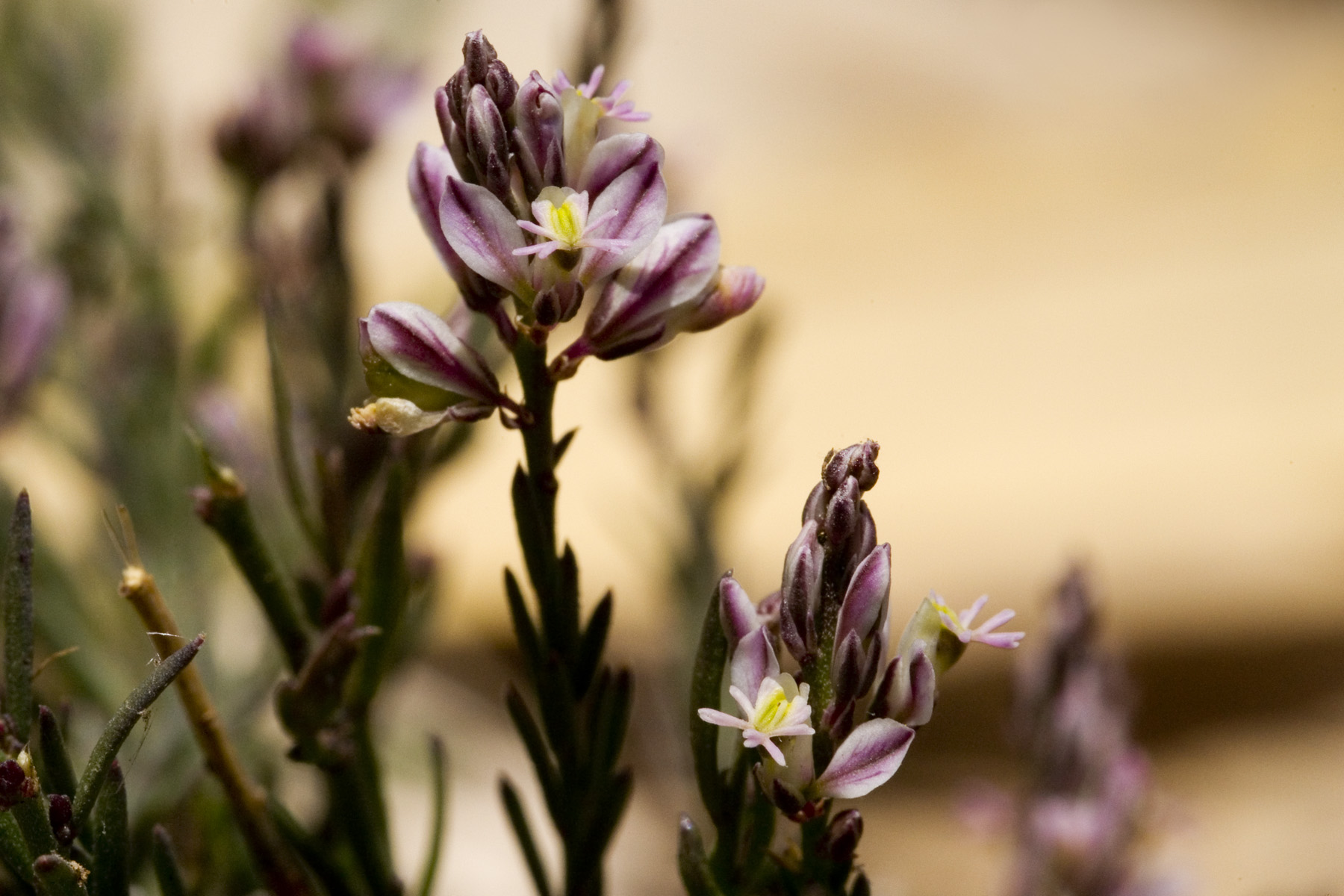
- In the Guadalupe Mountains in Eddy County, New Mexico

Scientific classification
- Kingdom: Plantae
- Clade: Embryophytes
- Clade: Tracheophytes
- Clade: Spermatophytes
- Clade: Angiosperms
- Clade: Eudicots
- Clade: Rosids
- Order: Fabales
- Family: Polygalaceae
- Genus: Senega
- Species: S. scoparioides

Binomial name
- Senega scoparioides (Chodat) J.F.B.Pastore & J.R.Abbott

Synonyms
- Polygala scoparioides Chodat; Polygala scoparia var. multicaulis A.Gray

= Senega scoparioides =

Species of flowering plant

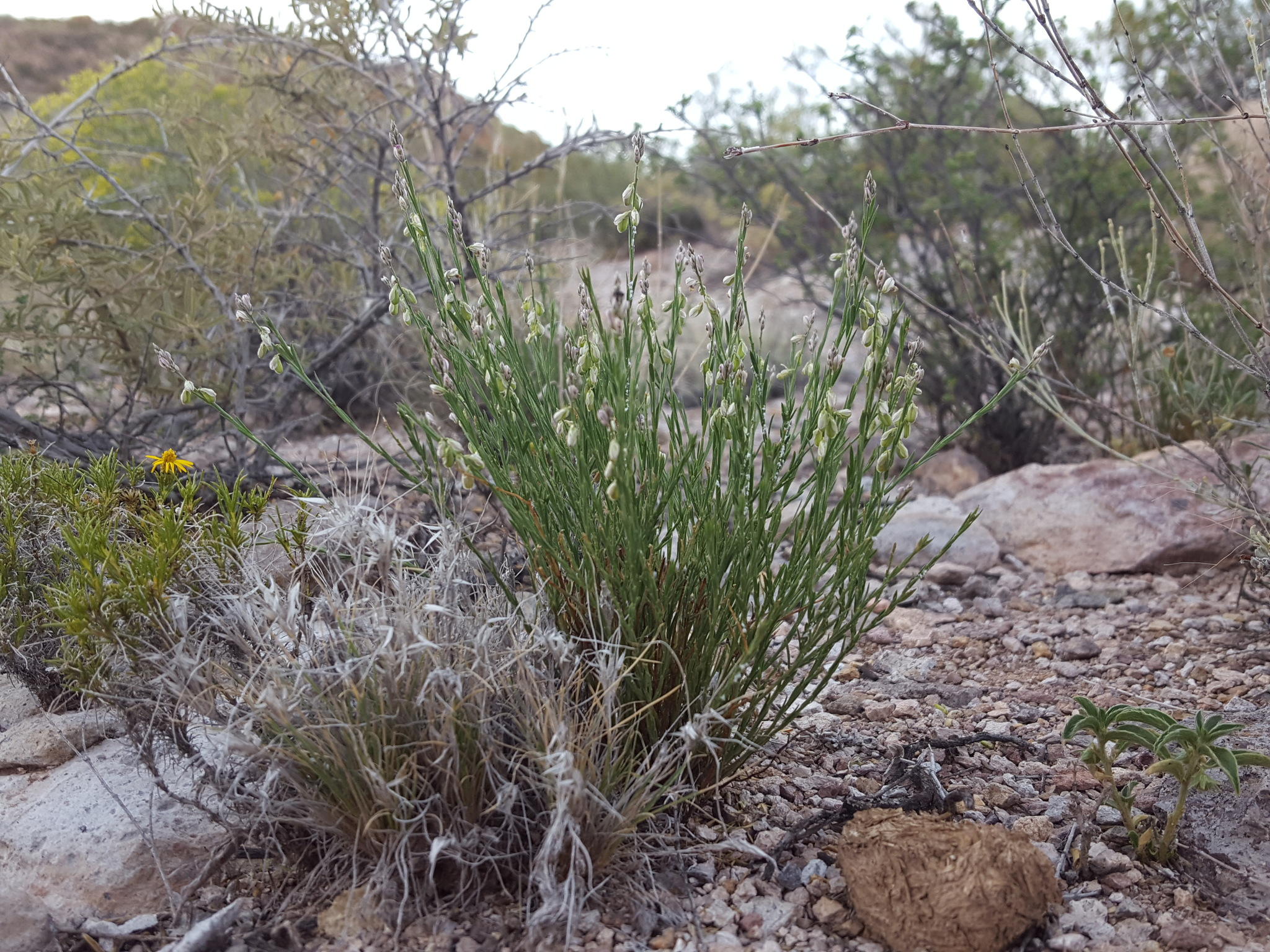
In Doña Ana County, New Mexico

Senega scoparioides, common name broom milkwort, is a flowering plant in the Senega genus and Polygalaceae family. A perennial, it grows in dry shrubland and desert environments in Arizona, Texas, New Mexico, and parts of northern Mexico.

It has been documented at Big Bend National Park, Guadalupe Mountains National Park, and Montezuma Castle National Monument.

It is noted as a deciduous perennial growing on rocky slopes, especially limestone.
