= Senega hookeri =

Scientific classification
- Kingdom: Plantae
- Clade: Embryophytes
- Clade: Tracheophytes
- Clade: Spermatophytes
- Clade: Angiosperms
- Clade: Eudicots
- Clade: Rosids
- Order: Fabales
- Family: Polygalaceae
- Genus: Senega
- Species: S. hookeri

Binomial name
- Senega hookeri (Torr. & A.Gray) J.F.B.Pastore & J.R.Abbott

Synonyms
- Polygala attenuata Hook.; Polygala hookeri Torr. & A.Gray

Species of flowering plant

Senega hookeri (common name Hooker's milkwort) is a species of flowering plant in the milkwort family (Polygalaceae). It is endemic to Alabama.
