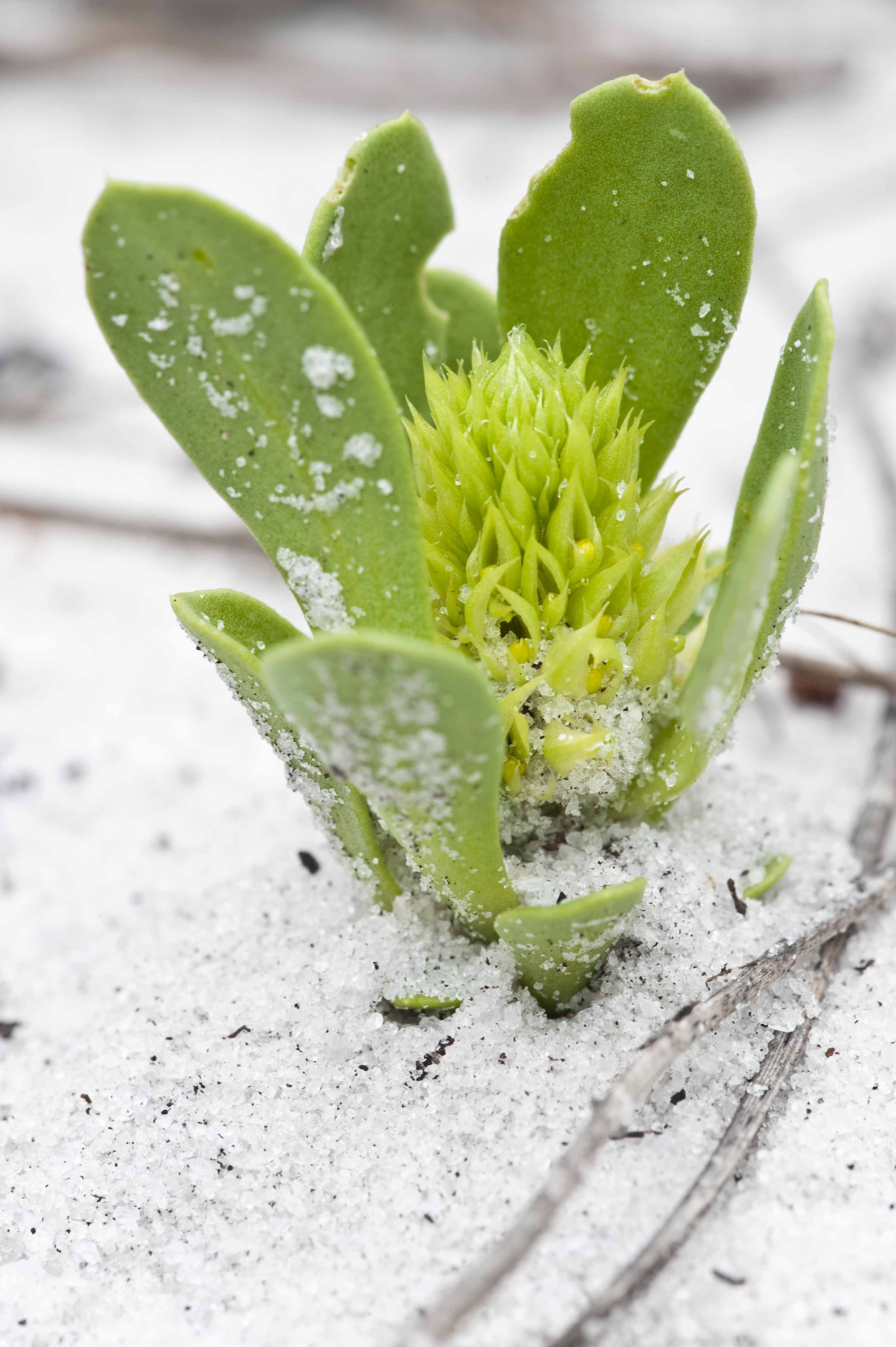

Conservation status
- Critically Imperiled (NatureServe)

Scientific classification
- Kingdom: Plantae
- Clade: Embryophytes
- Clade: Tracheophytes
- Clade: Angiosperms
- Clade: Eudicots
- Clade: Rosids
- Order: Fabales
- Family: Polygalaceae
- Genus: Senega
- Species: S. smallii

Binomial name
- Senega smallii (R.R.Sm. & Ward) J.F.B.Pastore & J.R.Abbott

Synonyms
- Pilostaxis arenicola Small; Polygala arenicola Small; Polygala smallii R.R.Sm. & D.B.Ward

= Senega smallii =

Species of flowering plant

Senega smallii, commonly known as tiny polygala and tiny milkwort, is a rare species of flowering plant in the milkwort family endemic to Florida in the United States, where it is limited to the south-eastern coast of the peninsula. The plant is now only known from eight sites, with most individuals located on one site in Miami-Dade County. The species is threatened by the loss of its habitat and is a federally listed endangered species of the United States.

== Description ==
The plant is a petite biennial herb growing 2 to 4 centimeters tall from the top of its taproot. The leaves are spatula-shaped and form a rosette at the base of the stems. They are closely packed and measure up to about 3.5 centimeters in length. The top of each stem is occupied by a short inflorescence of yellow-green flowers. The inflorescence often does not exceed the length of the leaf rosette. The plants have an aboveground lifespan of about 180 days, after which they disappear until the next wildfire sweeps the area.

== Distribution ==
This plant grows in Florida scrub and pine rockland habitat in Miami-Dade, Palm Beach, St. Lucie, and Martin counties in Florida. It occurs on public property occupied by Zoo Miami and adjacent United States Coast Guard property. 10,000 plants have been counted at the latter site, the largest population of the plant. It has been noted at the Fort Lauderdale Executive Airport in a preserve established there for gopher tortoise. The species has a cyclic life cycle and may exist at sites where it has not been seen recently.

== Habitat ==
The habitat occupied by this plant is maintained by a natural fire regime. Fire helps the plant by removing competing plants. It requires open spaces with sunlight and tolerates disturbance, and it resprouts readily after wildfire has affected the habitat. At times, it has been positively affected by the disturbance created during hurricanes.

Long-term fire suppression in the region has allowed the plant's habitat to become overgrown with large and woody vegetation. Habitat conservation must involve periodic prescribed burns or another method of opening the overgrown canopy. Fire is also beneficial because it may trigger germination of the seeds: experiments showed 50% more germination and faster germination in seeds that had been exposed to smoke. Seeds persist in a soil seed bank until they are prompted to germinate.

Another main threat to the species is destruction of its habitat for the construction of residential and commercial real estate.
