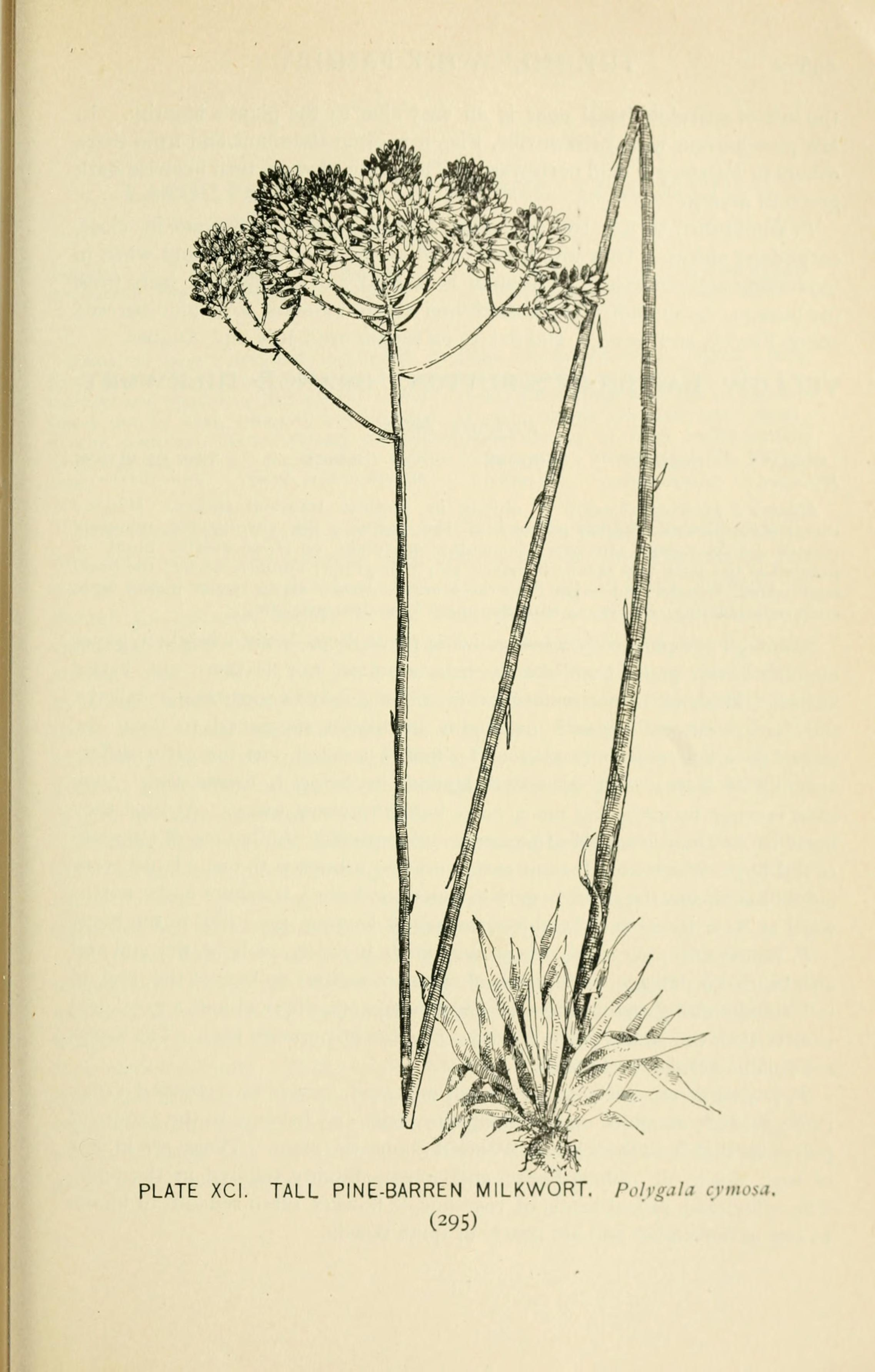

Scientific classification
- Kingdom: Plantae
- Clade: Embryophytes
- Clade: Tracheophytes
- Clade: Spermatophytes
- Clade: Angiosperms
- Clade: Eudicots
- Clade: Rosids
- Order: Fabales
- Family: Polygalaceae
- Genus: Senega
- Species: S. cymosa

Binomial name
- Senega cymosa Walter

Synonyms
- List: Pilostaxis cymosa (Walter) Small; Polygala cymosa Walter; Polygala acutifolia Torr. & A.Gray; Polygala attenuata Nutt.; Polygala corymbosa Michx.; Polygala graminifolia Poir.

= Senega cymosa =

Species of flowering plant

Senega cymosa, the tall pinebarren milkwort, is a species of flowering plant in the family Polygalaceae. It is endemic to the United States.

== Description ==
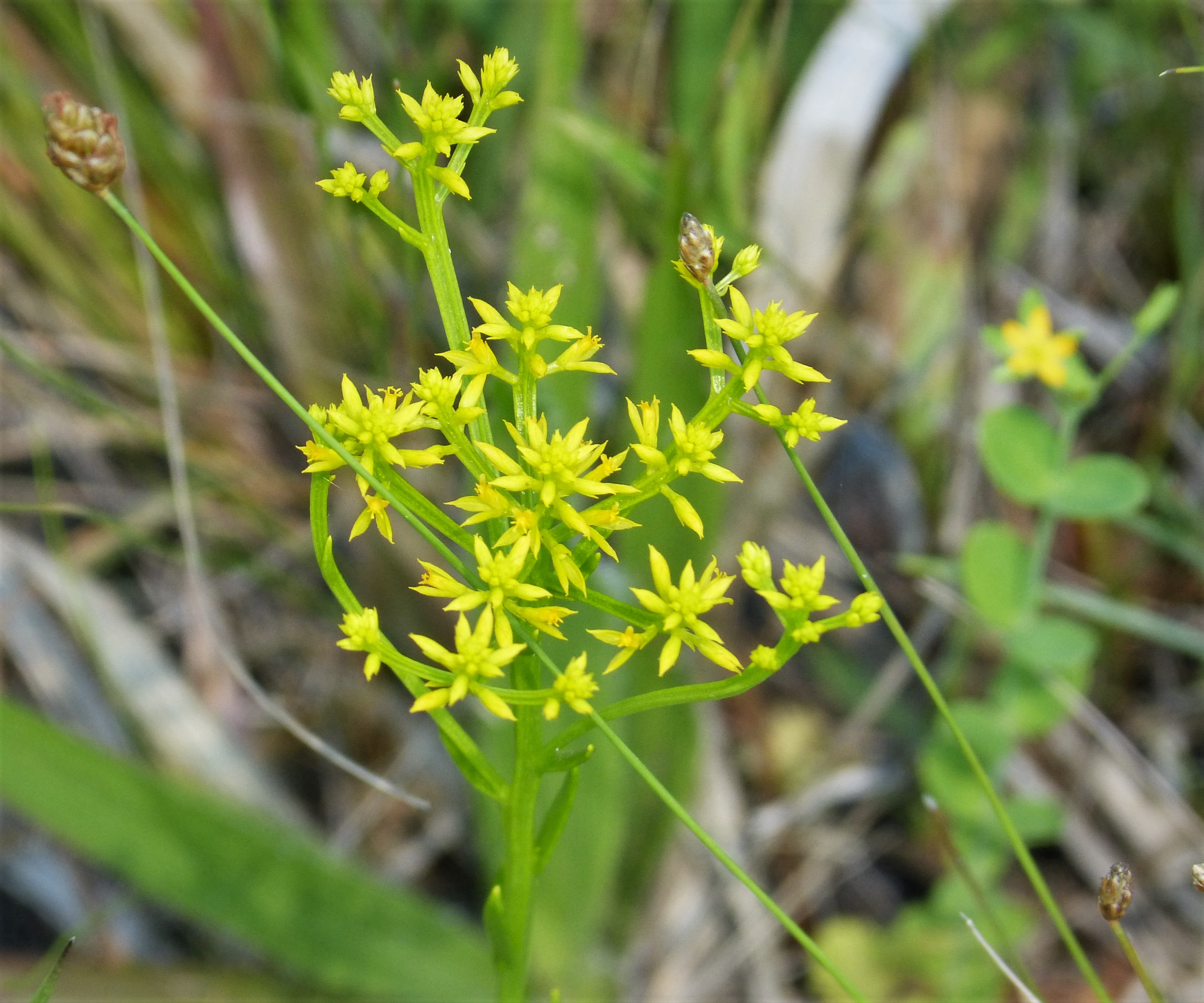

S. cymosa possesses entire leaves, whorled or alternately arranged. The basal leaves are lanceolate to linear in shape, 4 to 7 centimeters in length and 3 to 7 millimeters wide. The flowers vary in color, including white, yellow, pink, and lavender.

== Distribution and habitat ==
This species' native range encompasses the area between New Jersey and North and South Carolina.

S. cymosa is considered to be an obligate wetland plant. It occurs in habitats such as pine flatwoods, depressional wetlands, and cypress depressions.
