= Senega ambigua =

Scientific classification
- Kingdom: Plantae
- Clade: Embryophytes
- Clade: Tracheophytes
- Clade: Spermatophytes
- Clade: Angiosperms
- Clade: Eudicots
- Clade: Rosids
- Order: Fabales
- Family: Polygalaceae
- Genus: Senega
- Species: S. ambigua

Binomial name
- Senega ambigua (Nutt.) J.F.B.Pastore & J.R.Abbott

Synonyms
- List: Polygala ambigua Nutt.; Polygala verticillata var. ambigua (Nutt.) Alph.Wood; Polygala alba var. bicolor (Kunth) Chodat; Polygala bicolor Kunth in F.W.H.von Humboldt, A.J.A.Bonpland & C.S.Kunth; Polygala missurica Raf.; Sexilia missurica Raf.

Species of flowering plant

Senega ambigua is a species of flowering plant in the milkwort family (Polygalaceae). It was first described in 1818 and is native to the United States and Japan.
