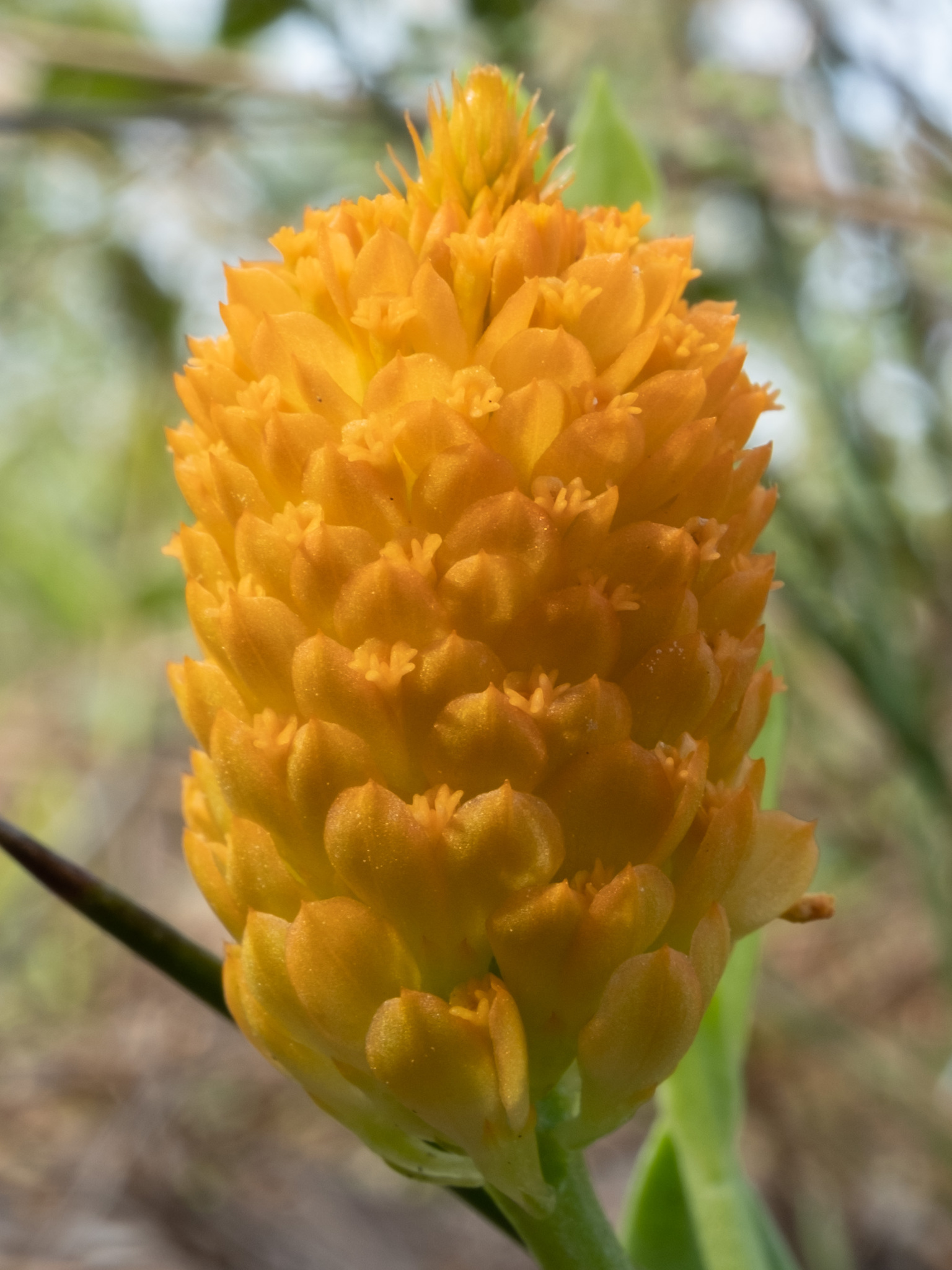

Conservation status
- Secure (NatureServe)

Scientific classification
- Kingdom: Plantae
- Clade: Tracheophytes
- Clade: Angiosperms
- Clade: Eudicots
- Clade: Rosids
- Order: Fabales
- Family: Polygalaceae
- Genus: Senega
- Species: S. lutea

Binomial name
- Senega lutea (L.) J.F.B.Pastore & J.R.Abbott

Synonyms
- Pilostaxis lutea (L.) Raf.; Polygala lutea L.; Polygala pseudosenega Bertol.

= Senega lutea =

Species of flowering plant

Senega lutea, commonly known as orange- or yellow milkwort, is a small herbaceous plant in the milkwort family (Polygonaceae) native to pine-barren depressions and swamps in coastal areas of the southern and eastern the United States. Other common names include bachelor's buttons, red-hot poker, candy weed, and bog Cheetos.

== Description ==
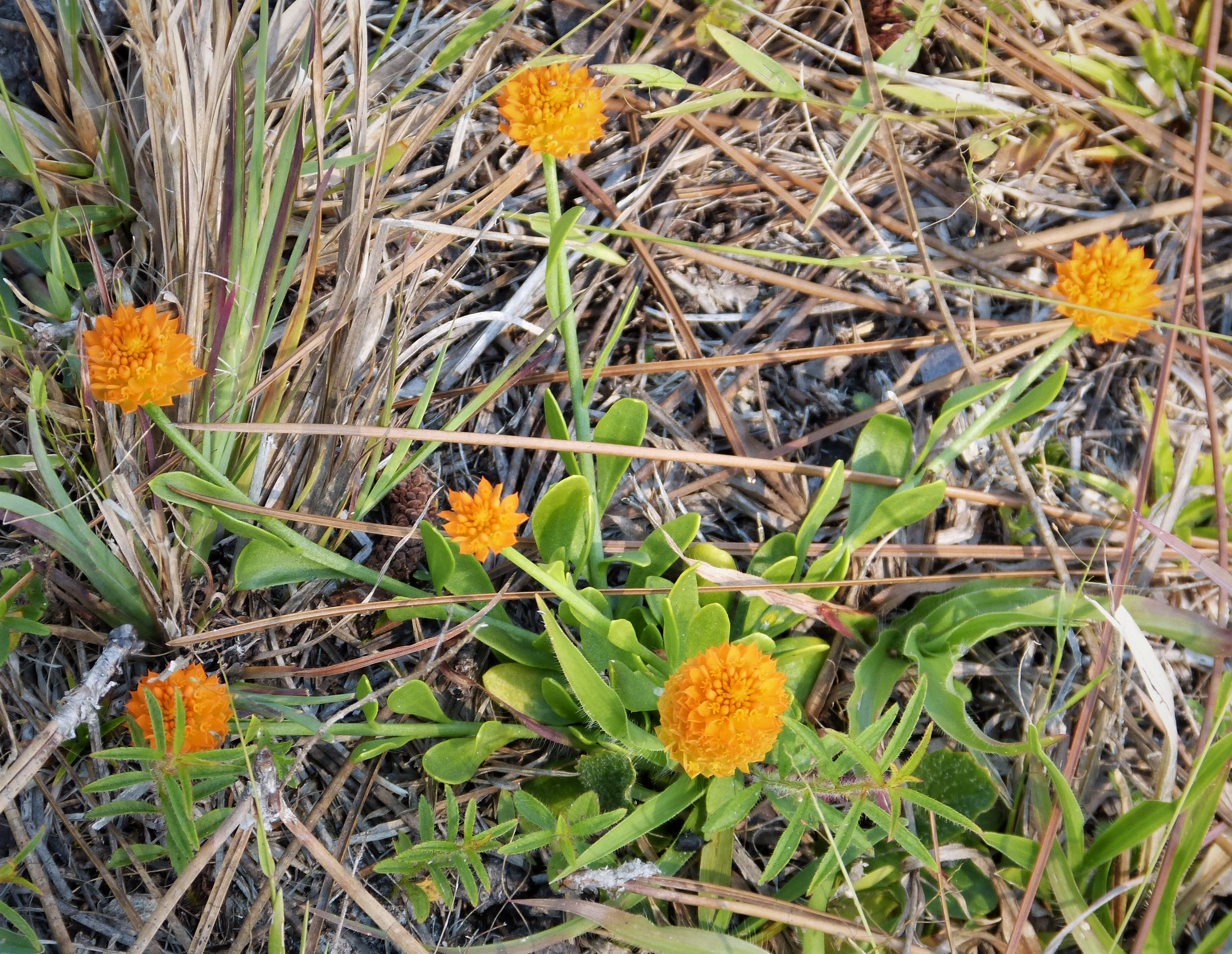

Senega lutea is an annual or biennial plant with simple or branching stems reaching 3-12 inches in height. Its bright orange-yellow flowers have three petals and five sepals. They are born in compact, thimble-shaped racemes (about 0.5 inches wide) atop 1-2 inch long pedicels. Individuals flowers are often indiscernible without magnification. Flowerheads are subtended by bracts. It flowers between April and October.

The basal leaves are thick, simple and spatulate, with entire margins. The stem leaves are similarly shaped, but smaller in size, becoming reduced as they ascend. The leaf arrangement is alternate. The roots have a minty aroma.

The fruit is a capsule. The seeds are spread almost exclusively by ants. The seeds contain elaisomes. The ants collect the seeds and take them back to their nest where they and their larvae consume the elaisomes, leaving the seeds intact. The seeds are then discarded outside the nest.

== Range and Habitat ==
Senega lutea is a widely distributed Coastal Plain species, ranging from coastal New York, south to southern Florida and eastern Louisiana.

It is a wetland species of many habitats, preferring moist to wet, acidic sandy soils. It favors pine savannas, but it occurs in wet pine flatwoods, ditches, pocosin borders, streamhead ecotones, and other wet or damp ground. It is not as strongly confined to savannas as are some Senega species.

== Taxonomy ==
The species was first described in 1753 by Carl Linnaeus. The epithet lutea comes from the Latin luteum or "yellow," and refers to the flower's color when dried.

This species was previously known as Polygala lutea. In 2023, the New World clade of Polygala was recognized as the genus Senega based on phylogenetic and morphological evidence.
