= Senega boykinii =

Scientific classification
- Kingdom: Plantae
- Clade: Embryophytes
- Clade: Tracheophytes
- Clade: Spermatophytes
- Clade: Angiosperms
- Clade: Eudicots
- Clade: Rosids
- Order: Fabales
- Family: Polygalaceae
- Genus: Senega
- Species: S. boykinii

Binomial name
- Senega boykinii (Nutt.) J.F.B.Pastore & J.R.Abbott

Synonyms
- List: Polygala boykinii Nutt.; Polygala bermudensis S.F.Blake; Polygala bicolor Hook.; Polygala boykinii var. sparsifolia Wheelock; Polygala boykinii var. suborbicularis R.W.Long; Polygala flagellaris Small; Polygala praetervisa Chodat; Polygala sparsiflora Small; Polygala sparsifolia (Wheelock) Small

Species of flowering plant

Senega boykinii, known by the common name Boykin's milkwort, is a species of flowering plant. It grows to about 2 feet high and produces a spear of white flowers. It is a dicot in the family Polygalaceae. It has been collected in the south-eastern United States (Florida, Alabama).
