= List of species described by the Lewis and Clark Expedition =

Meriwether Lewis collected many hundreds of plants on the Lewis and Clark Expedition. All of the plants Lewis collected in the first months of the Expedition were cached near the Missouri River to be retrieved on the return journey. The cache was completely destroyed by Missouri flood waters. Other collections were lost in varying ways, and we now have only 237 plants Lewis collected, 226 of which are in the Philadelphia Herbarium. Lewis hired Frederick Pursh for $70 to do the complex task of describing 124 of his collections, which Pursh did and published in 1814.

== Animals ==
=== Mammals ===
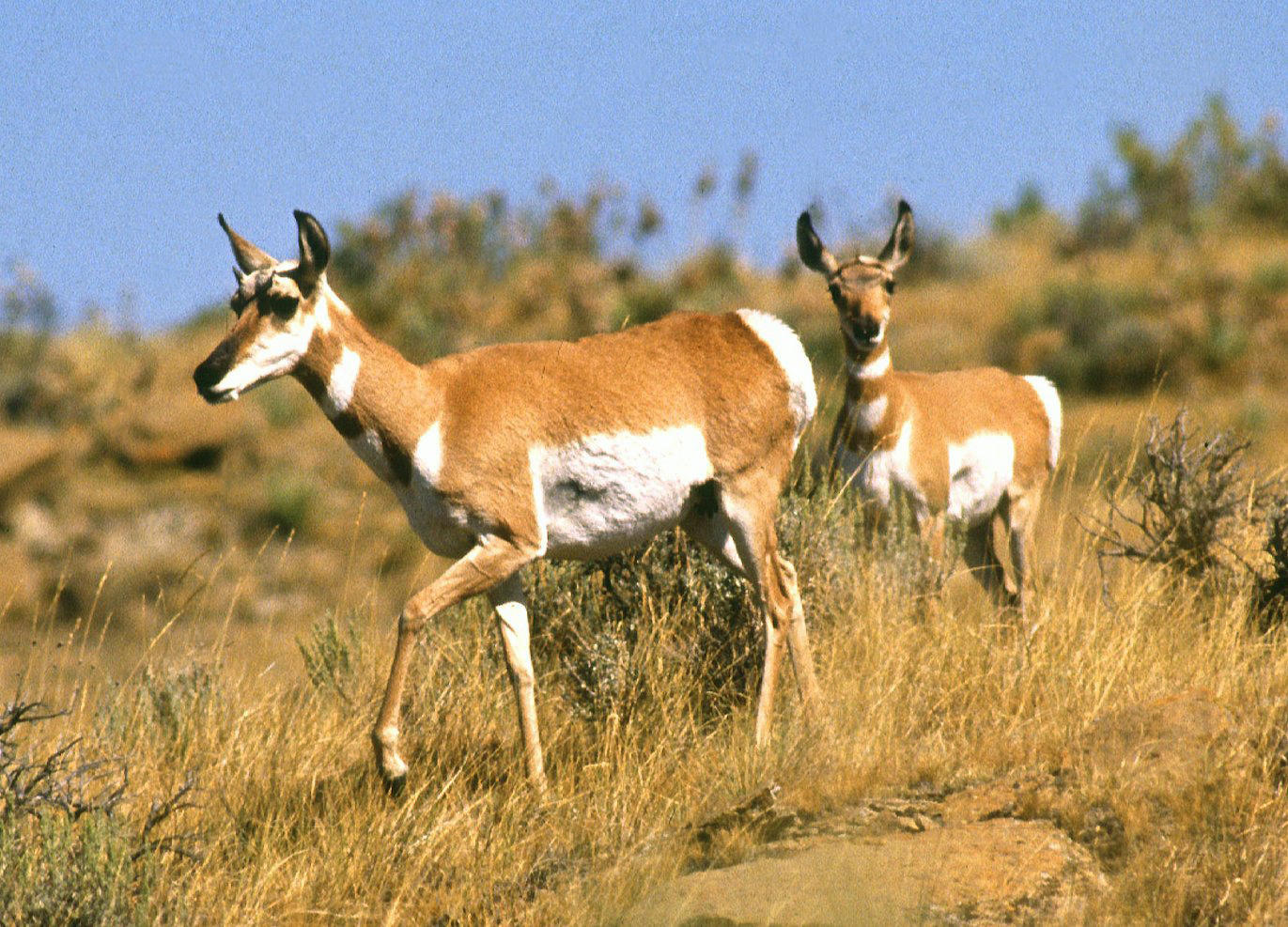
Pronghorn

- Discovered (for the first time by European Americans):
  - Black-tailed prairie dog (Cynomys ludovicianus)
  - Bushy-tailed woodrat (Neotoma cinerea)
  - Grizzly bear (Ursus arctos horribilis)
  - Mule deer (Odocoileus hemionus)
  - Pronghorn (Antilocapra americana)
  - Swift fox (Vulpes velox)
  - White-tailed jackrabbit (Lepus townsendii)
- Described:
  - American badger (Taxidea taxus)
  - American beaver (Castor canadensis)
  - Badlands bighorn sheep (Ovis canadensis auduboni)
  - Bison (Bison bison)
  - Black bear (Ursus americanus)
  - Columbian black-tailed deer (Odocoileus hemionus columbianus)
  - Columbian ground squirrel (Spermophilus columbianus)
  - Coyote (Canis latrans)
  - Eastern cottontail (Sylvilagus floridanus)
  - Eastern fox squirrel (Sciurus niger)
  - Elk (Cervus canadensis)
  - Eastern gray squirrel (Sciurus carolinensis)
  - Gray wolf (Canis lupus)
  - Long-tailed weasel (Mustela frenata)
  - Muskrat (Fiber zibethicus)
  - Mountain lion (Puma concolor)
  - North American river otter (Lontra canadensis)
  - Northern pocket gopher (Thomomys talpoides)
  - Northern short-tailed shrew (Blarina brevicauda)
  - Porcupine (Erethizon dorsatum)
  - Red fox (Vulpes vulpes)
  - Richardson's ground squirrel or flickertail (Spermophilus richardsonii)
  - Striped skunk (Mephitis mephitis)
  - Thirteen-lined ground squirrel (Spermophilus tridecemlineatus)
  - White-tailed deer (Odocoileus virginianus)

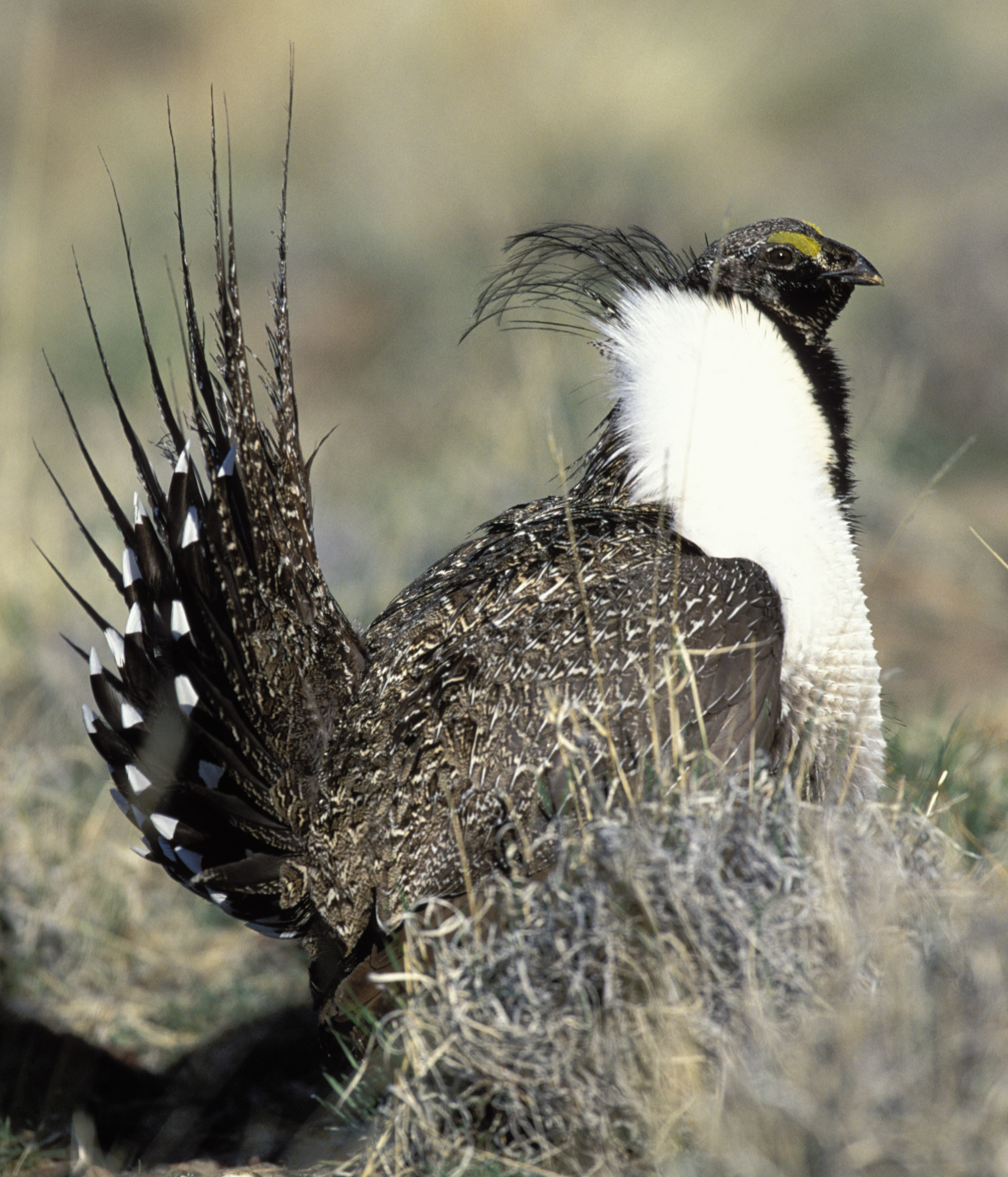
Greater sage grouse

=== Birds ===
- Discovered (for the first time by European Americans):
  - Clark's nutcracker (Nucifraga columbiana)
  - Common poorwill (Phalaenoptilus nuttallii)
  - Greater sage-grouse (Centrocercus urophasianus)
  - Interior least tern (Sterna antillarum athalassos)
  - Lewis' woodpecker (Melanerpes lewis)
- Described:
  - American crow (Corvus brachyrhynchos)
  - American goldfinch (Carduelis tristis)
  - American kestrel (Falco sparverius)
  - American robin (Turdus migratorius)
  - American white pelican (Pelecanus erythrorhynchos)
  - Bald eagle (Haliaeetus leucocephalus)
  - Bank swallow (Riparia riparia)
  - Belted kingfisher (Ceryle alcyon)
  - Black-bellied plover (Pluvialis squatarola)
  - Blue grouse (Dendragapus obscurus)
  - Blue jay (Cyanocitta cristata)
  - Brewer's blackbird (Euphagus cyanocephalus)
  - Brown-headed cowbird (Molothrus ater)
  - California Condor (Gymnogyps californianus)
  - Canada goose (Branta canadensis)
  - Carolina parakeet (Conuropsis carolinensis)
  - Cedar waxwing (Bombycilla cedrorum)
  - Cliff swallow (Hirundo pyrrhonota or Petrochelidon pyrrhonota)
  - Piping Plover (Charadrius melodus)
  - Columbian sharp-tailed grouse (Tympanuchus phasianellus columbianus)
  - Common Nighthawk (Chordeiles minor)
  - Common raven (Corvus corax)
  - Eastern kingbird (Tyrannus tyrannus)
  - Great blue heron (Ardea herodias)
  - Great egret (Ardea alba)
  - Greater prairie-chicken (Tympanuchus cupido pinnatus)
  - Golden eagle (Aquila chrysaetos)
  - Great horned owl (Bubo virginianus)
  - Hairy woodpecker (Picoides villosus)
  - Horned lark (Eremophila alpestris)
  - Killdeer (Charadrius vociferus)
  - Lark sparrow (Chondestes grammacus)
  - Loggerhead shrike (Lanius ludovicianus)
  - Long-billed curlew (Numenius americanus)
  - Mallard (Anas platyrhynchos)
  - Merganser (Mergus serrator)
  - Mourning dove (Zenaida macroura)
  - Northern flicker (Colaptes auratus)
  - Northern harrier (Circus cyaneus) - tentative
  - Osprey (Pandion haliaetus)
  - Passenger pigeon (Ectopistes migratorius)
  - Pinyon jay (Gymnorhinus cyanocephalus)
  - Piping plover (Charadrius melodus)
  - Plains sharp-tailed grouse (Tympanuchus phasianellus jamesi)
  - Red-headed woodpecker (Melanerpes erythrocephalus)
  - Red-tailed hawk (Buteo jamaicensis)
  - Red-winged blackbird (Agelaius phoeniceus)
  - Ruffed grouse (Bonasa umbellus)
  - Sandhill crane (Grus canadensis)
  - Snow goose (Chen caerulescens)
  - Sprague's pipit (Anthus spragueii)
  - Upland sandpiper (Bartramia longicauda)
  - Western meadowlark (Sturnella neglecta)
  - Whip-poor-will (Caprimulgus vociferus)
  - Whooping crane (Grus americana)
  - Wild turkey (Meleagris gallopavo)
  - Willet (Catoptrophorus semipalmatus)
  - Wood duck (Aix sponsa)

=== Amphibians ===
  - Chorus frog (Pseudacris triseriata)
  - Green frog (Rana clamitans)
  - Green tree frog (Hyla)
  - Western toad (Anaxyrus boreas)

=== Reptiles ===
  - Bull snake (Pituophis catenifer)
  - Horned lizard (Phrynosoma)
  - Spiny softshell turtle (Apalone spinifera)
  - Western fence lizard (Sceloporus occidentalis)
  - Western garter snake (Thamnophis elegans vagrans)
  - Western hognose snake (Heterodon nasicus)
  - Western rattlesnake (Crotalus viridis)

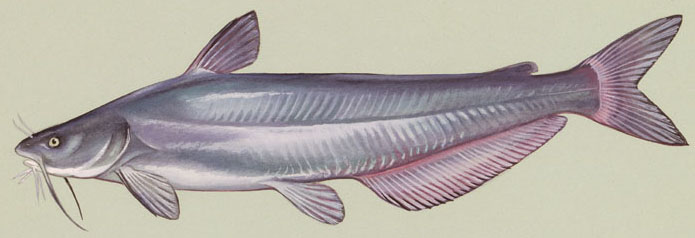
Blue catfish

=== Fish ===
- Discovered (for the first time by European Americans):
  - Blue catfish (Ictalurus furcatus)
  - Channel catfish (Ictalurus punctatus)
  - Goldeye (Hiodon alosoides)
  - Mountain whitefish (Prosopium williamsoni)
  - White sturgeon (Acipenser transmontanus)
- Described:
  - Cutthroat trout (Oncorhynchus clarki)
  - Westslope cutthroat trout (O. c. lewisi)
  - Coastal cutthroat trout (O. c. clarki)
  - Common northern sucker (Catostomus catostomus)
  - Sauger (Stizostedion canadensis)

== Plants ==
The plants listed below were indeed collected by Lewis, but a number of them (at least those marked with *******, were previously collected and described or were not described from the Lewis collections and therefore are not considered to be the first for science. For an accurate list see and

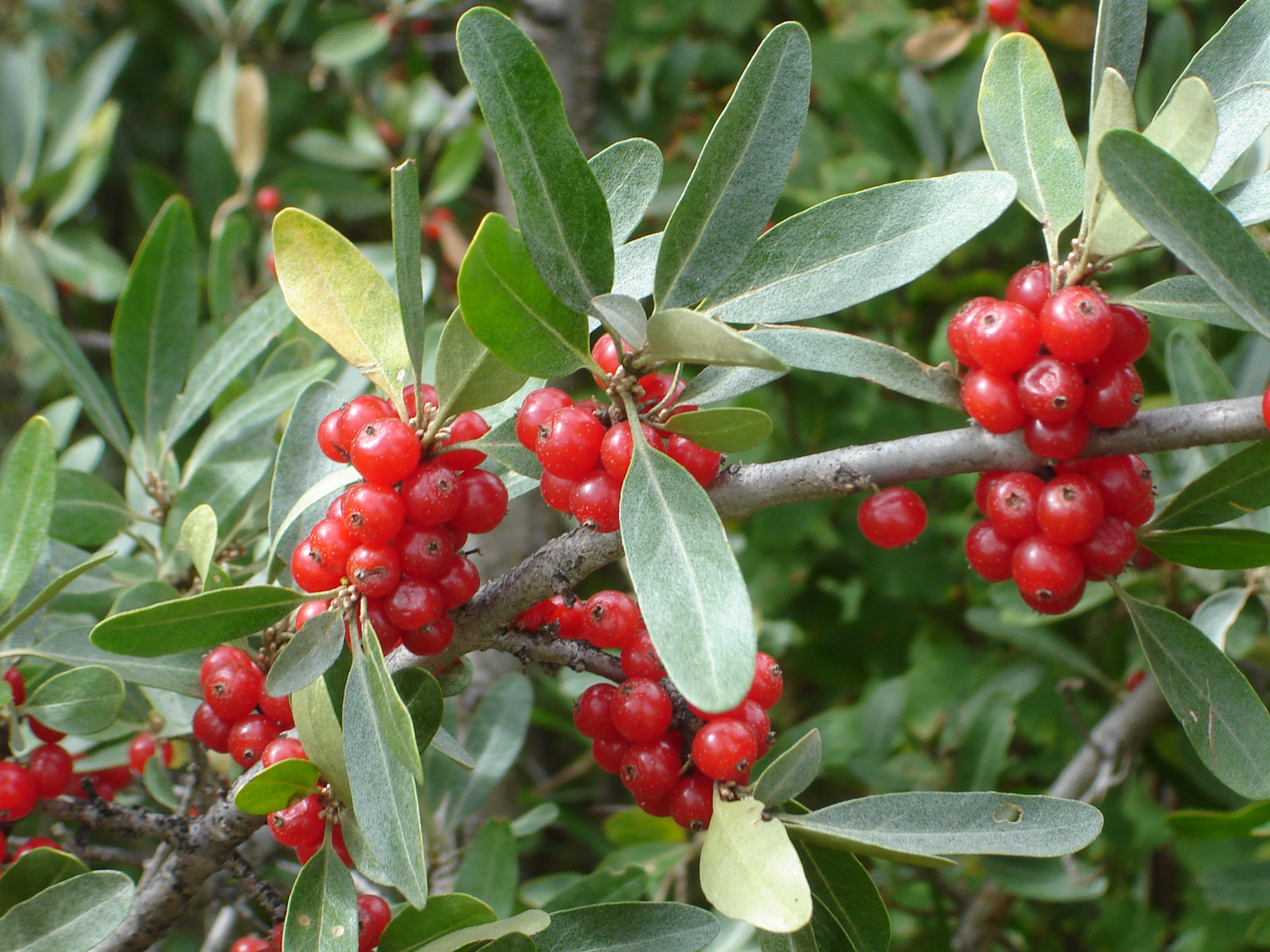

- Discovered (for the first time by European Americans):
  - Black greasewood (Sarcobatus vermiculatus)
  - Blue flax (Linum lewisii)
  - Buffaloberry (Shepherdia argentea)
  - Curly-top gumweed (Grindelia squarrosa)
  - Fringed sagebrush (Artemisia ludoviciana)
  - Indian tobacco (Nicotiana quadrivalvis)
  - Lanceleaf sage (Salvia reflexa)
  - Shadscale (Atriplex canescens)
  - Snow-on-the-mountain (Euphorbia marginata)
  - White milkwort (Polygala alba)
  - Aromatic aster (Aster oblongifolius)
  - Aromatic sumac also called squaw bush (Rhus aromatica)
  - Bearberry also called kinnikinnick (Arctostaphylos uva-ursi)
  - Bur oak (Quercus macrocarpa)
  - Broom snakeweed (Gutierrezia sarothrae)
  - Canada milk-vetch (Astragalus canadensis)
  - Common horsetail, also called scouring rush (Equisetum arvense)
  - Common juniper (Juniperus communis)
  - Common monkey-flower (Mimulus guttatus)
  - Creeping juniper (Juniperus horizontalis)
  - Dwarf sagebrush (Artemisia cana)
  - Eastern cottonwood (Populus deltoides)
  - False indigo (Amorpha fruticosa)
  - Fire-on-the-mountain (Euphorbia cyathophora)
  - Golden currant (Ribes aureum)
  - Large-flowered clammyweed (Polanisia dodecandra trachysperma)
  - Long-leaved sagebrush also called mugwort (Artemisia longifolia)
  - Meadow anemone (Anemone canadensis)
  - Missouri milk-vetch (Astragalus missouriensis)
  - Moundscale (Atriplex gardneri)
  - Needle-and-thread grass also called porcupine grass (Hesperostipa comata)
  - Pasture sagewort (Artemisia frigida)
  - Pin cherry (Prunus pennsylvanica)
  - Ponderosa pine (Pinus ponderosa)
  - Purple coneflower (Echinacea angustifolia)
  - Purple prairie-clover (Petalostemon purpurea or Dalea purpurea)
  - Rabbitbrush (Ericameria nauseosa; formerly Chrysothamnus nauseosus)
  - Raccoon grape (Ampelopsis cordata)
  - Rigid goldenrod (Solidago rigida)
  - Rocky Mountain beeplant (Cleome serrulata)
  - Rough gayfeather also called large button snakeroot (Liatris aspera)
  - Silky wormwood (Artemisia dracunculus)
  - Spiny goldenweed (Machaeranthera pinnatifida or Haplopappus spinulosus)
  - Thick-spike gayfeather also called prairie button snakeroot (Liatris pycnostachya)
  - Western red cedar also called Rocky Mountain juniper (Juniperus scopulorum)
  - Wild four-o'clock (Mirabilis nyctaginea)
  - Wild rice (Zizania palustris)
  - Wild rose (Rosa arkansana)

== See also ==
- Sacagawea
- Louisiana Purchase

== Sources ==
- Paul A. Johnsgard. "Lewis and Clark on the Great Plains: A Natural History".
- H. Wayne Phillips (2003). Plants of the Lewis and Clark Expedition. Mountain Press. ISBN 978-0-87842-477-1.
- Paul R. Cutright & Paul A. Johnsgard (2003). Lewis and Clark: Pioneering Naturalists (2nd ed.). University of Nebraska Press. ISBN 978-0-8032-6434-2.
- V. C. Holmgren (1984). "Birds of the Lewis and Clark journals". We Proceeded On. 10 (2–3). Lewis and Clark Trail Heritage Foundation: 17–22.
- The Journey - Science. "U.S. National Park Service - Experience Your America." <>.
