= Salvia pauciflora =

Salvia pauciflora is the scientific name of two species:

- Salvia pauciflora E.Peter is an illegitimate name for Salvia stibalii
- Salvia pauciflora Kunth is a synonym of Salvia reflexa
