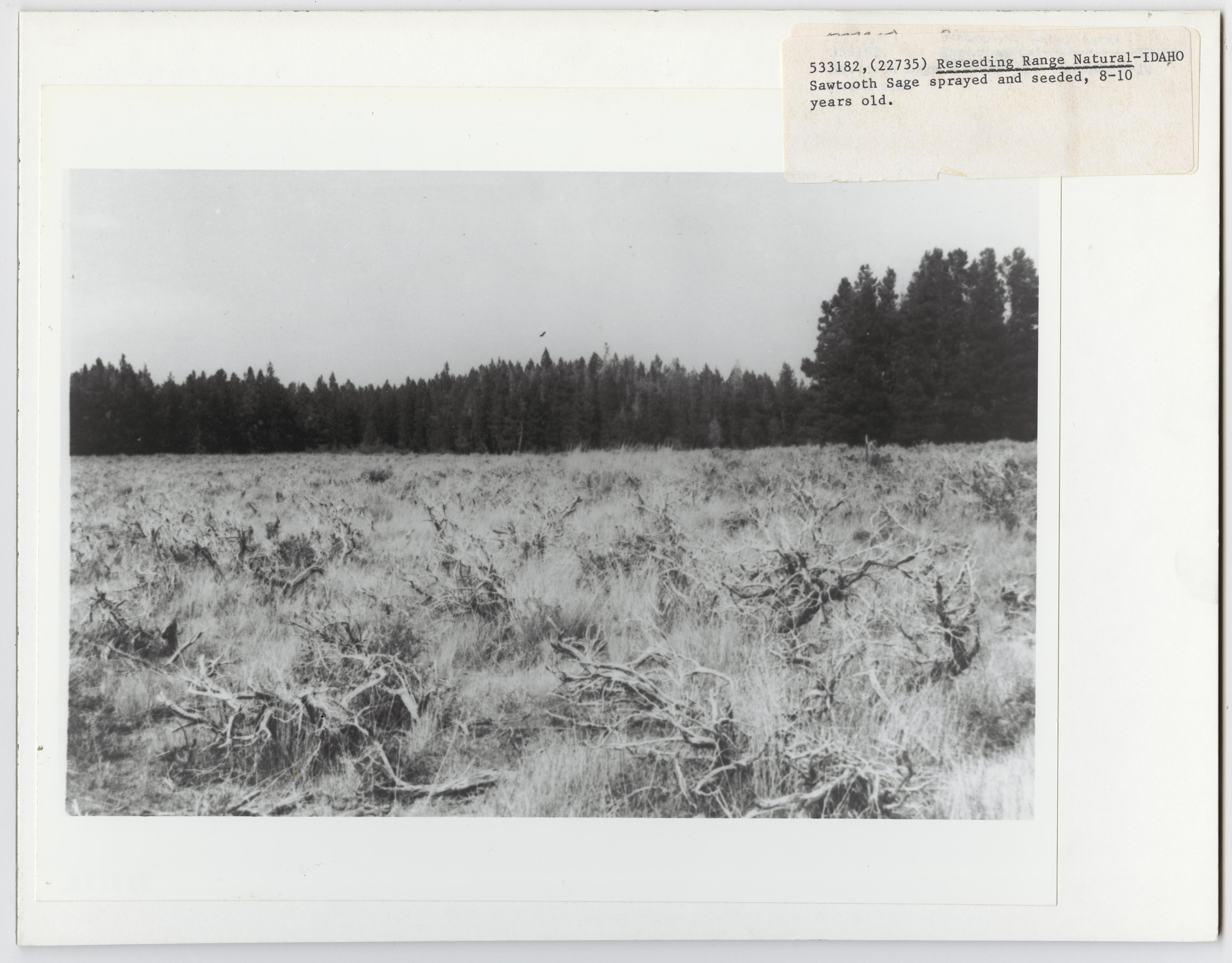
- Salvia subincisa on revegetated rangeland
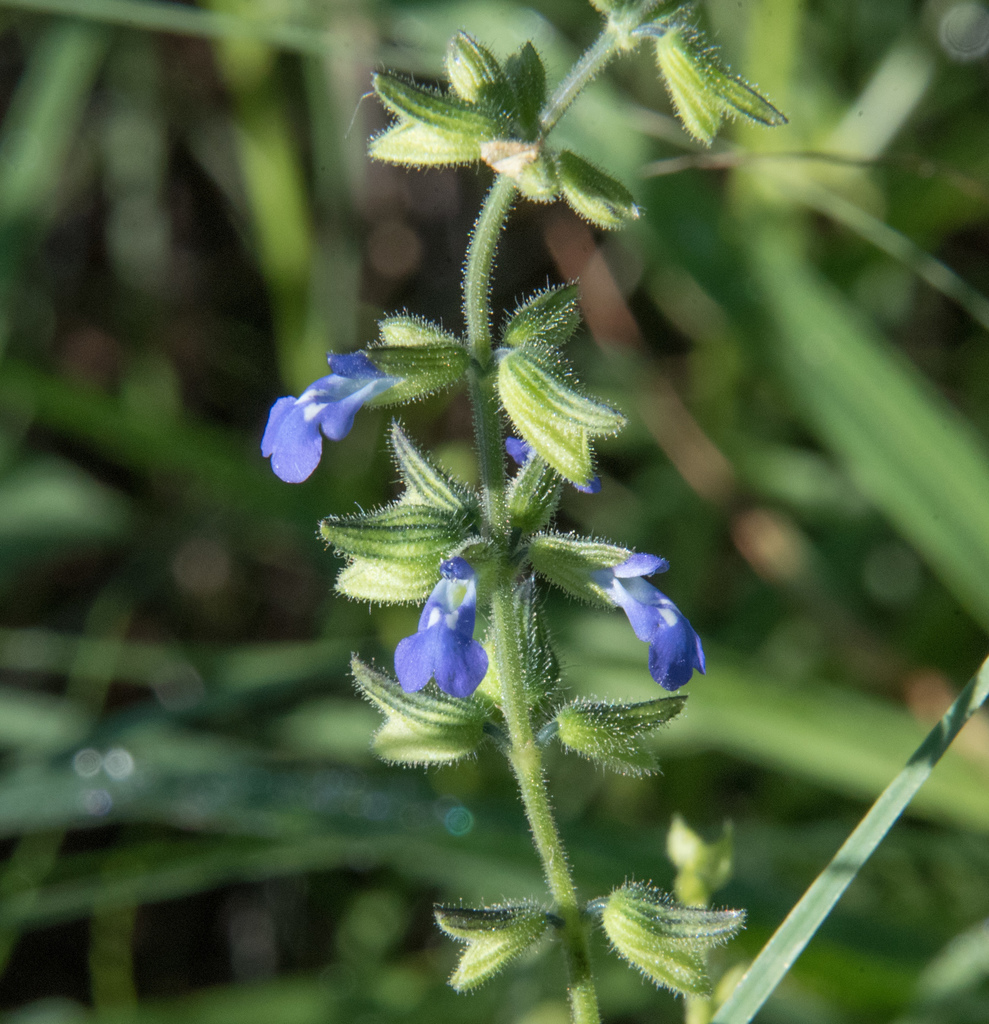

Scientific classification
- Kingdom: Plantae
- Clade: Tracheophytes
- Clade: Angiosperms
- Clade: Eudicots
- Clade: Asterids
- Order: Lamiales
- Family: Lamiaceae
- Genus: Salvia
- Species: S. subincisa

Binomial name
- Salvia subincisa Benth.

= Salvia subincisa =

Species of flowering plant

Salvia subincisa, the sawtooth sage or sharptooth sage, is a small erect Salvia species that is native to New Mexico, Arizona, and Texas in the United States, and the Baja California peninsula, Chihuahua, and Sonora in Mexico. It is typically found growing in sandy areas near roadsides or other arid parts of the American southwest. It is very often associated with Pueblo ruins in New Mexico, along with Cleome serrulata and Lithospermum caroliniense.

Salvia subincisa has deep purple flowers with white markings inside, above small opposite leaves. It is similar, though smaller, than Salvia reflexa.
