= Polygala scoparia =

Polygala scoparia may refer to two different species of plants:

- Polygala scoparia Benth., a taxonomic synonym for white milkwort (Senega alba)
- Polygala scoparia Kunth, a taxonomic synonym for Senega mexicana
