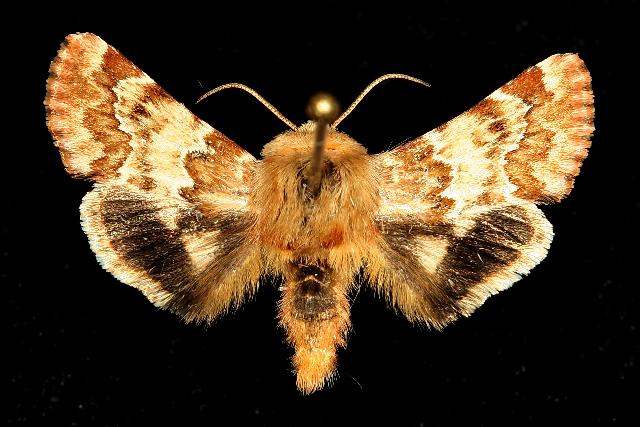

Scientific classification
- Kingdom: Animalia
- Phylum: Arthropoda
- Class: Insecta
- Order: Lepidoptera
- Superfamily: Noctuoidea
- Family: Noctuidae
- Genus: Schinia
- Species: S. septentrionalis

Binomial name
- Schinia septentrionalis Walker, 1858

= Schinia septentrionalis =

Species of moth

Schinia septentrionalis, the northern flower moth, is a moth of the family Noctuidae. The species was first described by Francis Walker in 1858. It is found in North America from Missouri to Quebec to South Carolina and Louisiana. Records include Colorado, Oklahoma, South Dakota and Texas. It is listed as threatened in the US state of Connecticut.

Male

Female

The wingspan is about 25 mm. There is one generation per year.

The larvae feed on various asters including Symphyotrichum laeve, and Symphyotrichum oblongifolium.
