= Blue flax =

Blue flax is a common name of several species in the genus Linum (flax):

- Linum lewisii, native to western North America
- Linum narbonense, native to Europe
- Linum perenne, native to Europe
