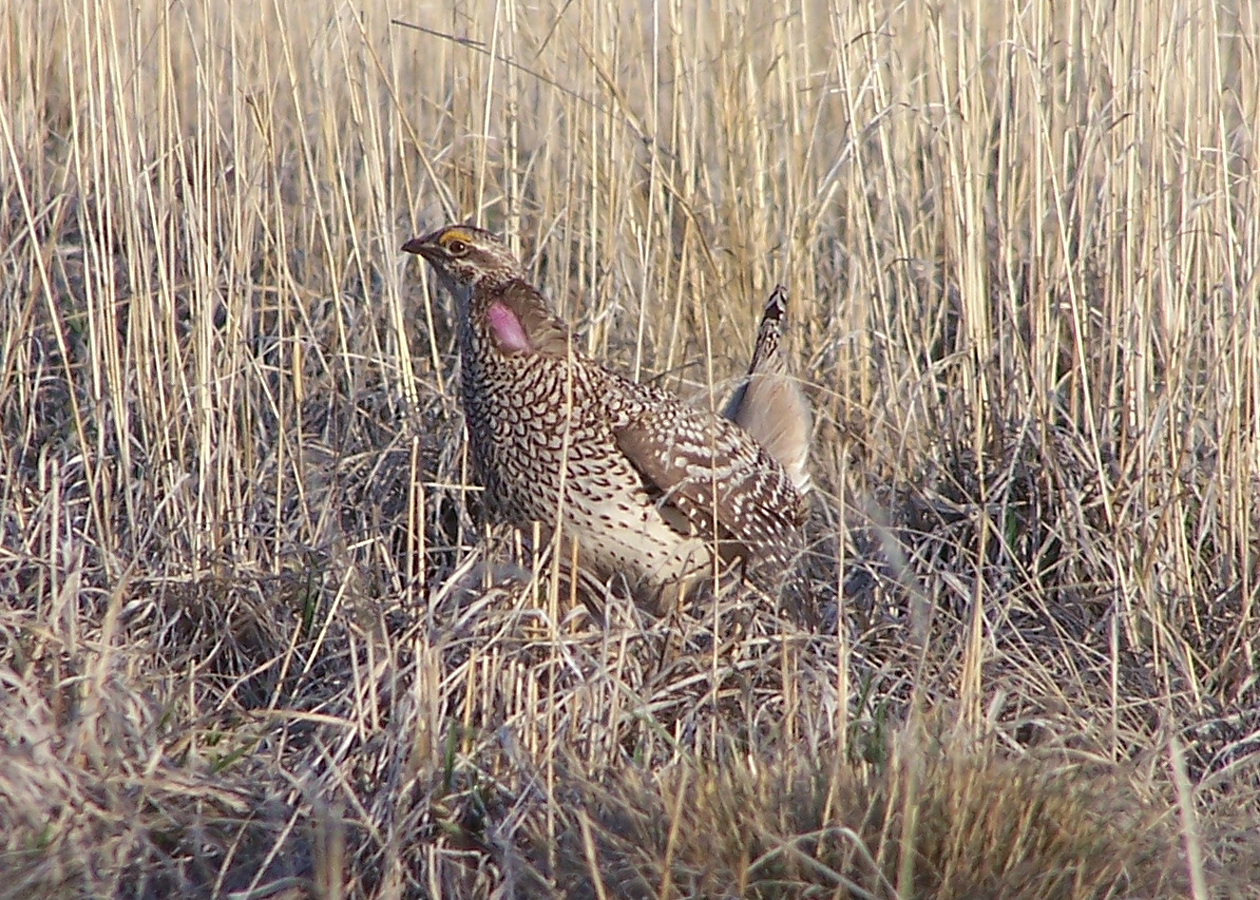

Scientific classification
- Kingdom: Animalia
- Phylum: Chordata
- Class: Aves
- Order: Galliformes
- Family: Phasianidae
- Genus: Tympanuchus
- Species: T. phasianellus
- Subspecies: T. p. columbianus

Trinomial name
- Tympanuchus phasianellus columbianus (Linnaeus, 1758)

= Columbian sharp-tailed grouse =

Subspecies of bird

The Columbian sharp-tailed grouse (Tympanuchus phasianellus columbianus) is a subspecies of sharp-tailed grouse native to the Western United States and British Columbia.

== Description ==
Out of the seven subspecies of sharp-tailed grouse, the Columbian is the smallest at 15–20 inches (38–51 cm) in length. They have plumage with a base of grayish-brown, white and black markings, and a white wedge-shaped tail. Males have a longer tail, a purple throat patch and a yellow comb over the eye.

== Distribution and habitat ==
Its historical range extended from British Columbia south through eastern Washington and Oregon to Northeastern California, Nevada, and Utah, and then west to the Continental Divide. It inhabits sagebrush-bunchgrass prairies, meadow-steppe, mountain shrub, and riparian zones. It was first described by the Lewis and Clark expedition, and was named by George Ord.

== Status and conservation ==
Due to excessive habitat loss, it is no longer present in the majority of its range, and exists only in isolated remnant populations that comprise less than ten percent of its original habitat. These populations are sequestered in central British Columbia, southeastern Idaho and northern Utah, and northwestern Colorado and south-central Wyoming. It was extirpated entirely from Oregon by the 1960s, but was reintroduced in Wallowa County beginning in 1991; a small population of the birds now persists in the Leap Area of Zumwalt Prairie.

The Columbian sharp-tailed grouse was petitioned to be listed as Threatened under the Endangered Species Act twice, but was denied in both cases. It is currently considered a Species of Concern in several U.S. states.
