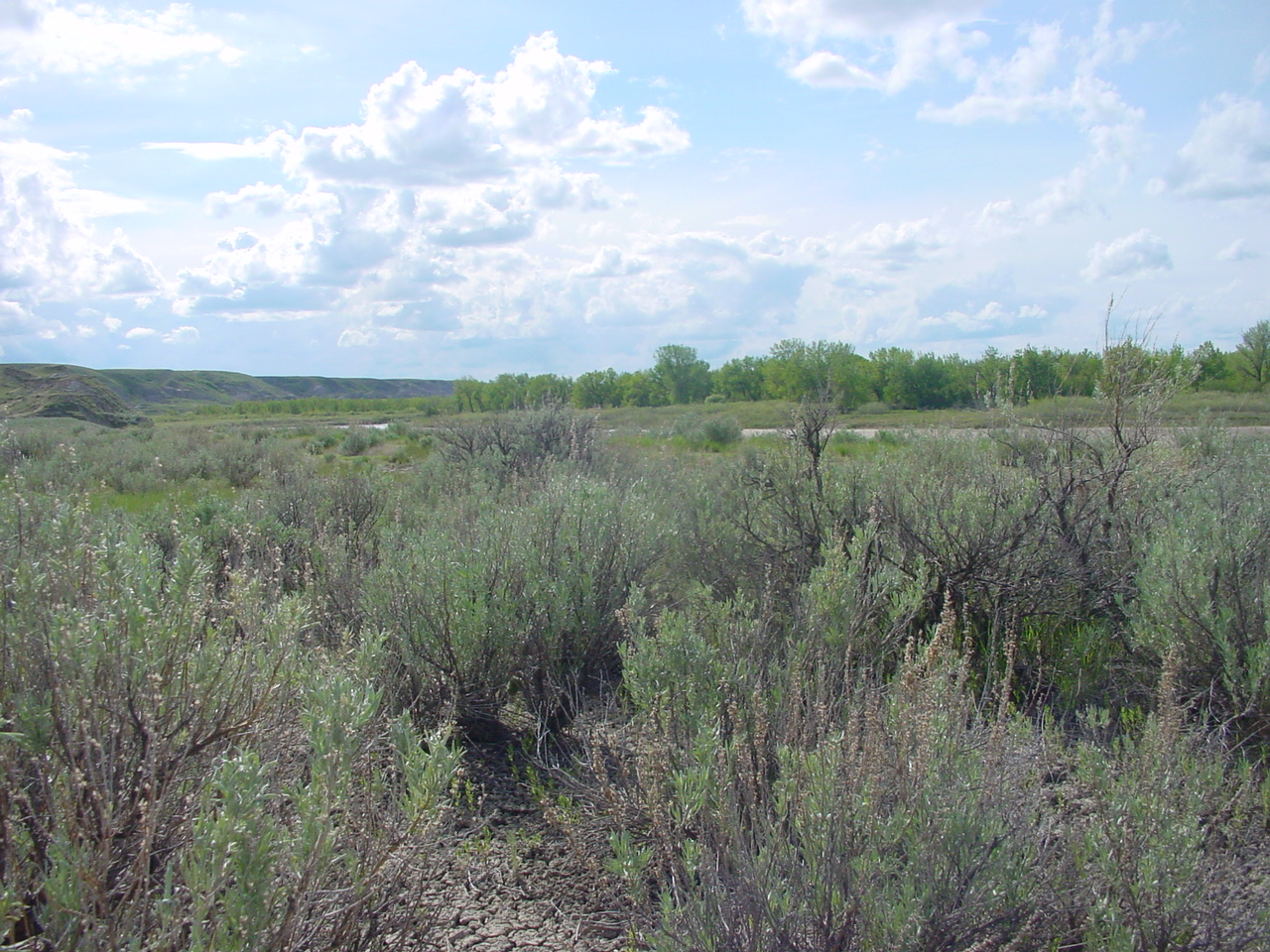
- Silver sagebrush in Dinosaur Provincial Park, Alberta

Conservation status
- Secure (NatureServe)

Scientific classification
- Kingdom: Plantae
- Clade: Tracheophytes
- Clade: Angiosperms
- Clade: Eudicots
- Clade: Asterids
- Order: Asterales
- Family: Asteraceae
- Genus: Artemisia
- Species: A. cana

Binomial name
- Artemisia cana Pursh

Synonyms
- Artemisia columbiensis Nutt.; Seriphidium canum (Pursh) W.A.Weber; Artemisia bolanderi A.Gray, syn of subsp. bolanderi; Seriphidium bolanderi (A.Gray) Y.R.Ling, syn of subsp. bolanderi; Artemisia argilosa Beetle, syn of subsp. viscidula; Artemisia viscidula (Osterh.) Rydb., syn of subsp. viscidula

= Artemisia cana =

Species of plant

Artemisia cana is a species of sagebrush native to western and central North America; it is a member of the sunflower family. It is known by many common names, including silver sagebrush, sticky sagebrush, silver wormwood, hoary sagebrush, and dwarf sagebrush.

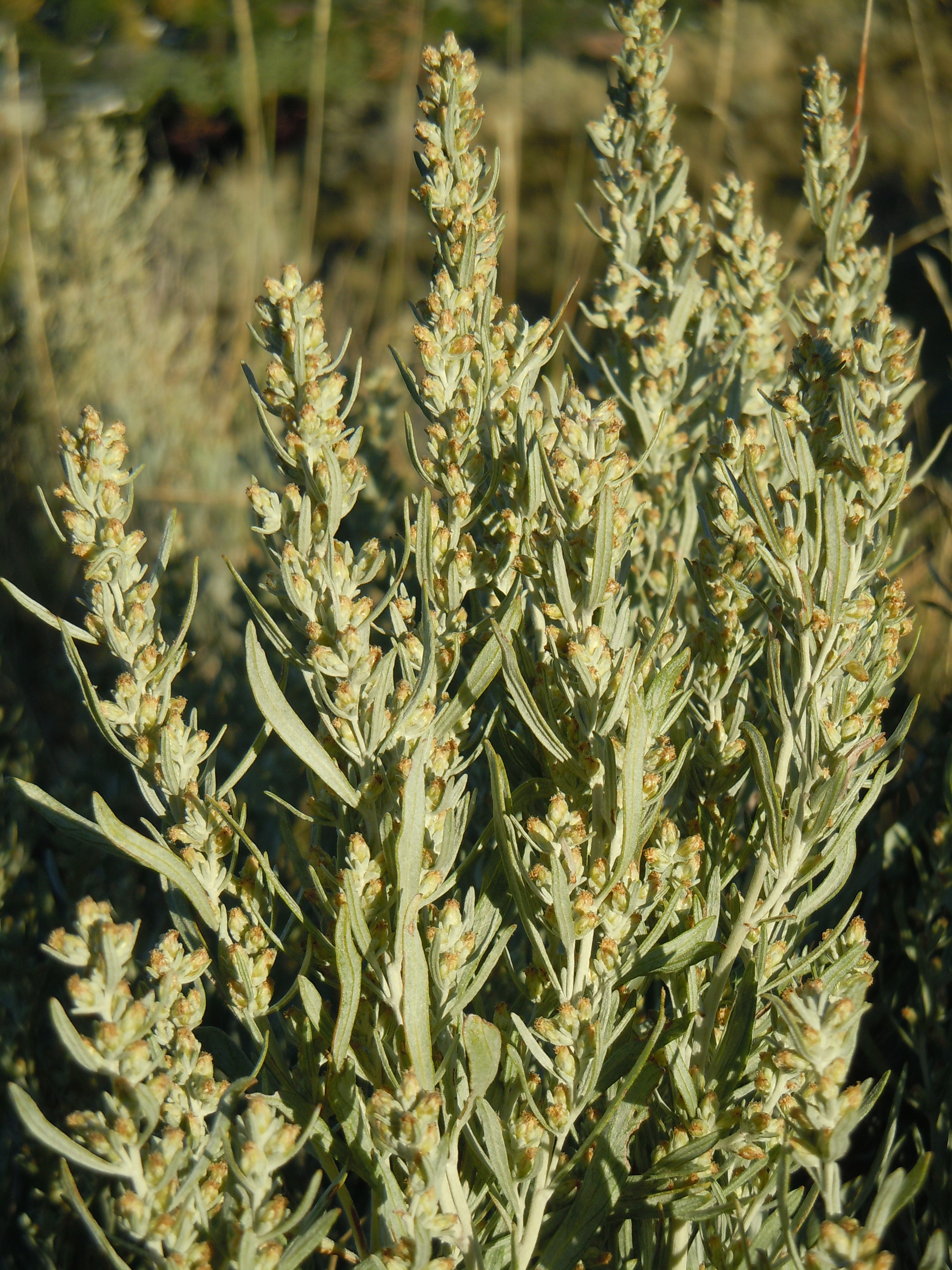
Gray foliage.

== Distribution and habitat ==
Artemisia cana, Silver sagebrush, is an aromatic shrub found in grasslands, floodplains and montane forests. Artemisia cana is native to the Canadian provinces of British Columbia, Alberta, Saskatchewan and Manitoba and the American states of Alaska, Oregon, California, Idaho, Nevada, Utah, Arizona, Montana, Wyoming, Colorado, New Mexico, North and South Dakota, Nebraska and Minnesota. It grows in rocky, open grasslands and floodplains.

== Description ==
The type specimen of Artemisia cana was described informally by its collector, Meriwether Lewis (collected on October 1, 1804, in the vicinity of Centinel Creek in South Dakota, during the Lewis and Clark Expedition), in the following passage from Original Journals of Lewis and Clark, edited by Thwaites in 1904 :

On these hills many aromatic herbs are seen; resembling in taste, smel [ [ [sic]] ] and appearance, the sage, hysop, wormwood, southernwood and two other herbs which are strangers to me the one resembling the camphor in taste and smell, rising to the height of 2 or 3 feet; the other about the same size, has a long narrow, smo[o]th, soft leaf of an agreeable smel [ sic ] and flavor; of this last the A[n]telope is very fond; they feed on it, and perfume the hair of their foreheads and necks with it by rubing [ sic ] against it.

Artemisia cana generally reaches 50–150 centimetres (20–59 in) in height, with examples west of the Continental Divide typically being shorter than those east of the divide.

The leaves have a narrow blade shape, are evergreen, grey-green in colour, and have a distinct aroma.

=== Subspecies ===
Subspecies include:

- Artemisia cana subsp. bolanderi — Bolander's silver sagebrush, silver sagebrush — mountain meadows and streambanks in eastern California and Oregon, and northwestern Nevada.
- Artemisia cana subsp. cana — plains silver sagebrush, Coaltown sagebrush, silver sagebrush — most of species range.
- Artemisia cana subsp. viscidula — mountain silver sagebrush, Coaltown sagebrush, silver sagebrush — sagebrush lowlands in Great Basin, Colorado Plateau, Snake River Plain.
