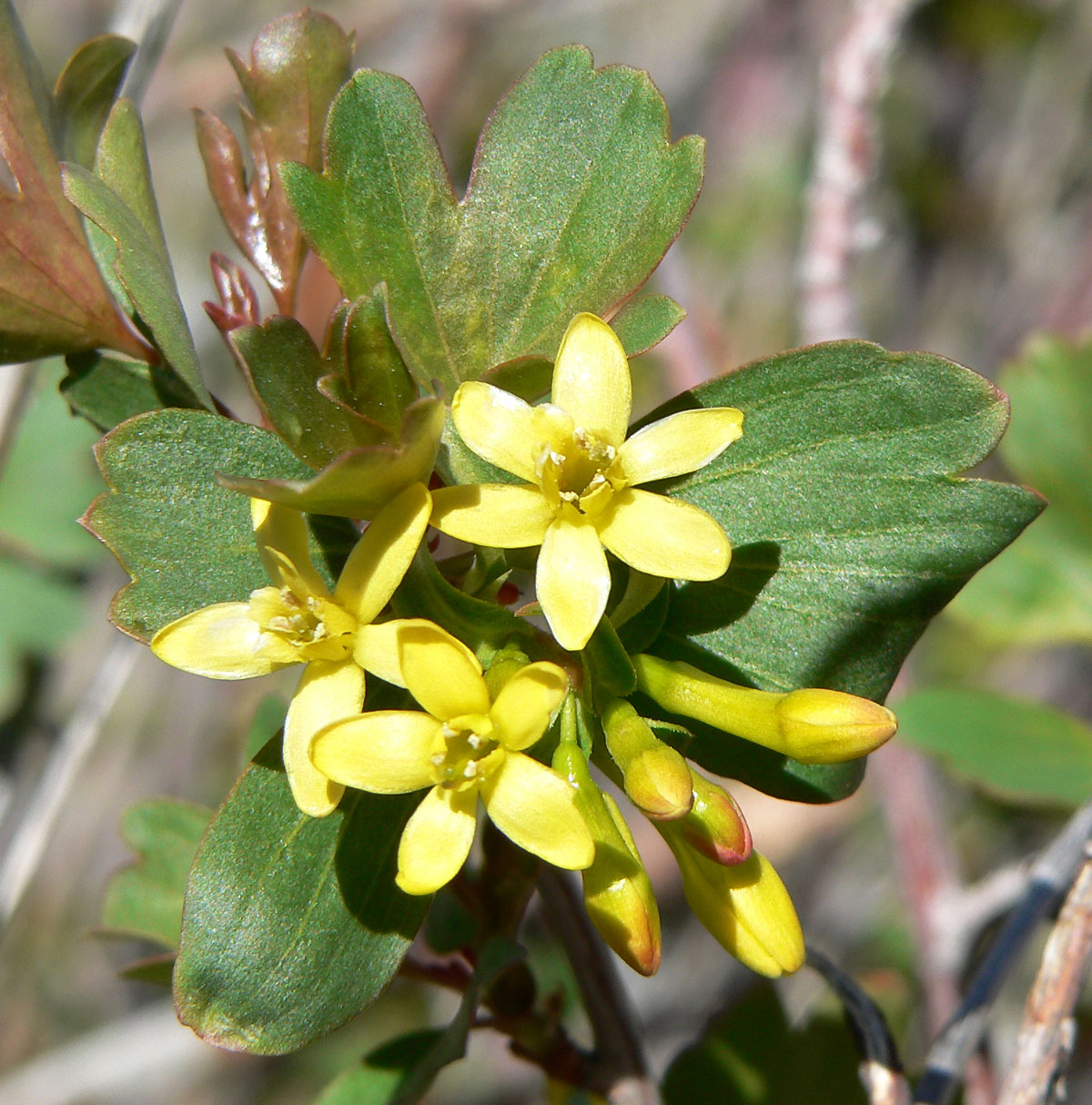
- R. aureum var. aureum, Spring Mountains, Nevada.

Conservation status
- Secure (NatureServe)

Scientific classification
- Kingdom: Plantae
- Clade: Tracheophytes
- Clade: Angiosperms
- Clade: Eudicots
- Order: Saxifragales
- Family: Grossulariaceae
- Genus: Ribes
- Subgenus: Ribes subg. Ribes
- Section: Ribes sect. Symphocalyx
- Species: R. aureum

Binomial name
- Ribes aureum Pursh 1813

Synonyms
- List: Chrysobotrya aurea (Pursh) Rydb.; Chrysobotrya intermedia Spach; Chrysobotrya lindleyana Spach; Chrysobotrya odorata (H.L.Wendl.) Rydb.; Chrysobotrya revoluta Spach; Coreosma longiflora Lunell; Coreosma odorata (H.L.Wendl.) Nieuwl.; Ribes aureum var. longiflorum (Nutt.) Jancz.; Ribes aureum var. tenuiflorum (Lindl.) Jeps.; Ribes flavum Berland.; Ribes fragrans Lodd.; Ribes longiflorum Nutt.; Ribes odoratum H.L.Wendl.; Ribes odoratum var. intermedium (Spach) Rehder ex A. Berger; Ribes palmatum Deshmukh; Ribes tenuiflorum Lindl.

= Ribes aureum =

Golden currant

Species of plant

Ribes aureum, known by the common names golden currant, clove currant, pruterberry and buffalo currant, is a species of flowering plant in the genus Ribes native to North America.

== Description ==
The plant is a small to medium-sized deciduous shrub, 2–3 metres (6 1/2–10 feet) tall. The leaves are 1.5–4 centimetres (1/2–1 1/2 in) long, green, semi-leathery, with 3 or 5 lobes; they turn red in autumn.

The plant blooms in spring with racemes of conspicuous golden yellow flowers, often with a pronounced, spicy fragrance similar to that of cloves or vanilla. Flowers may also be shades of cream to reddish, and are borne in clusters of up to 18. The shrub produces berries about 1 cm (3/8 in) in diameter from an early age. The ripe fruits are amber yellow to black. Those of variety villosum are black.

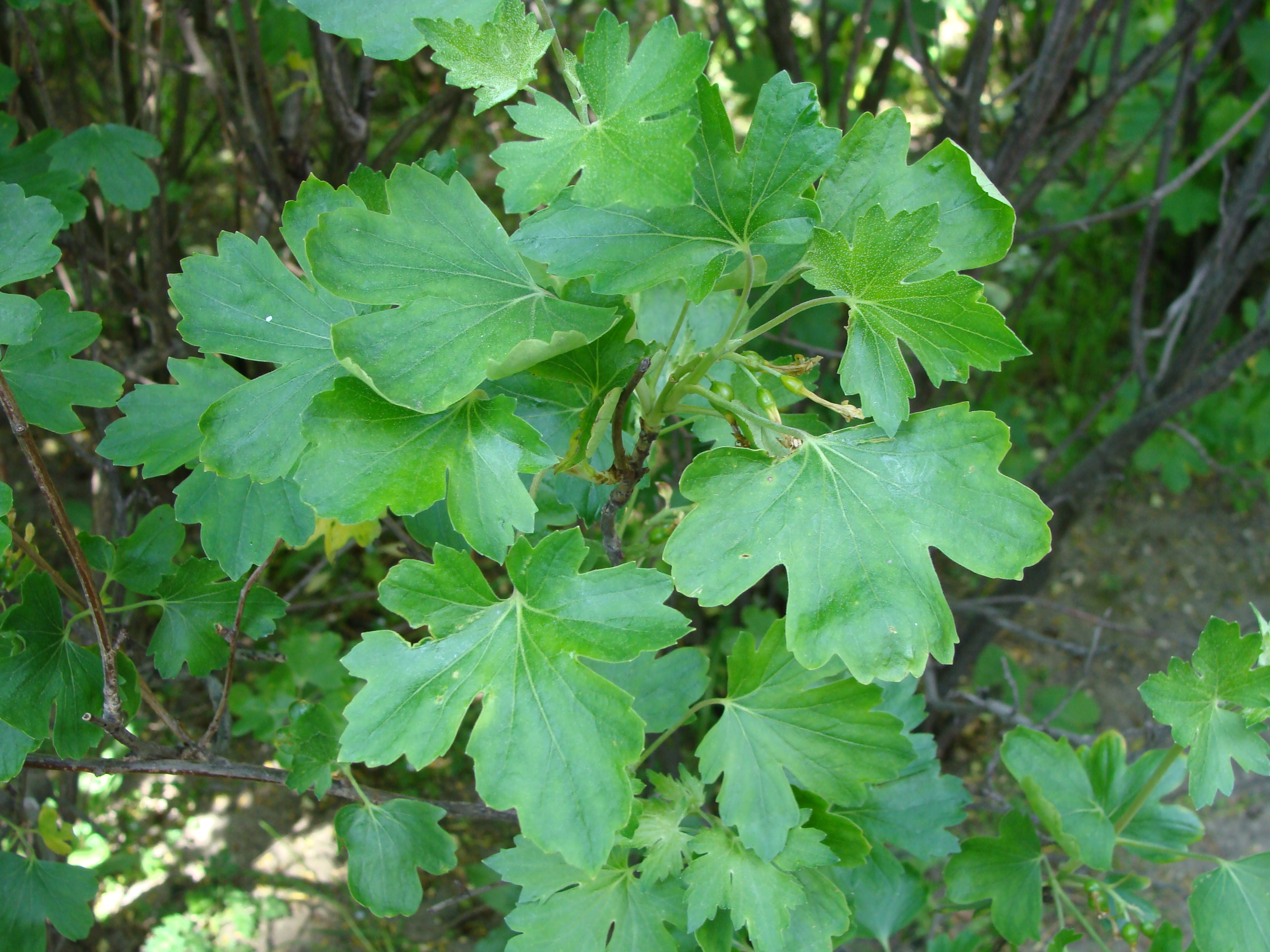
Leaves

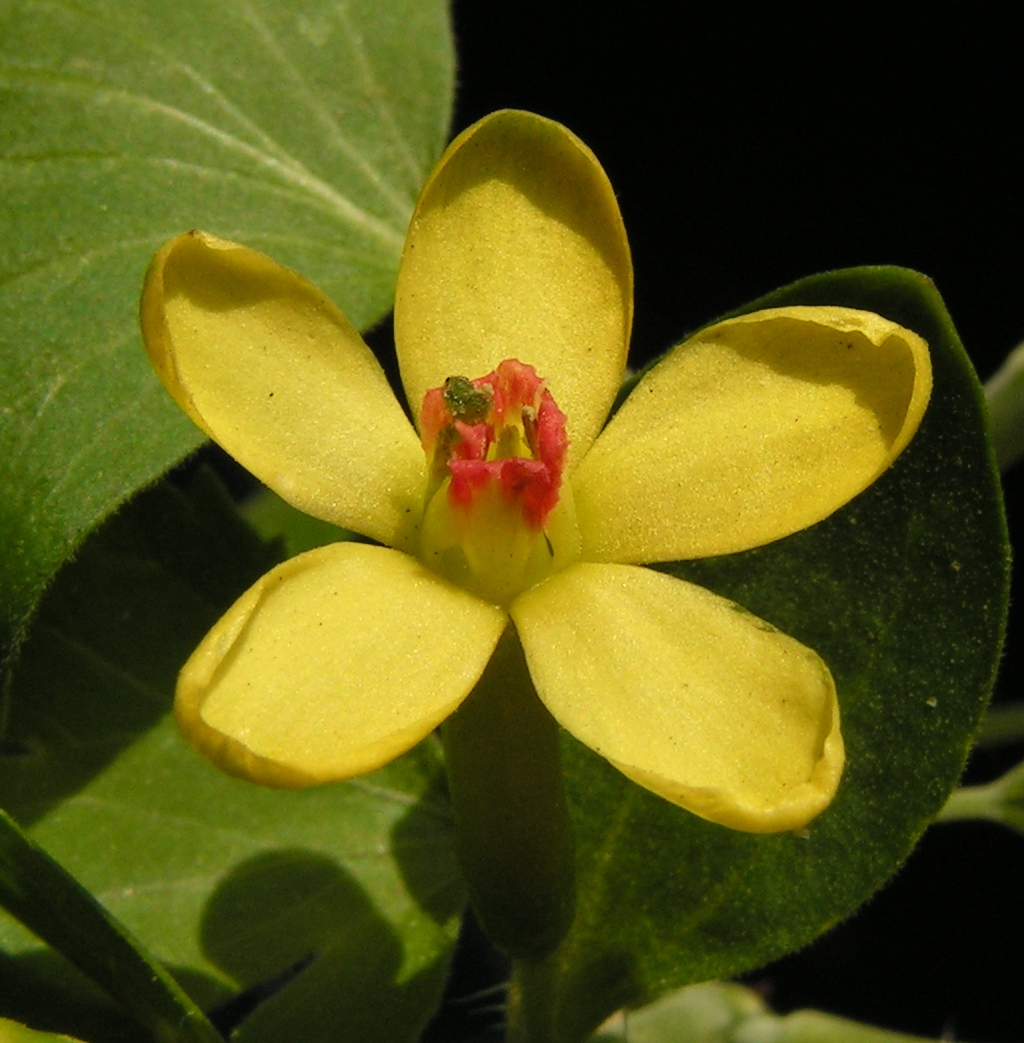
Flower close-up

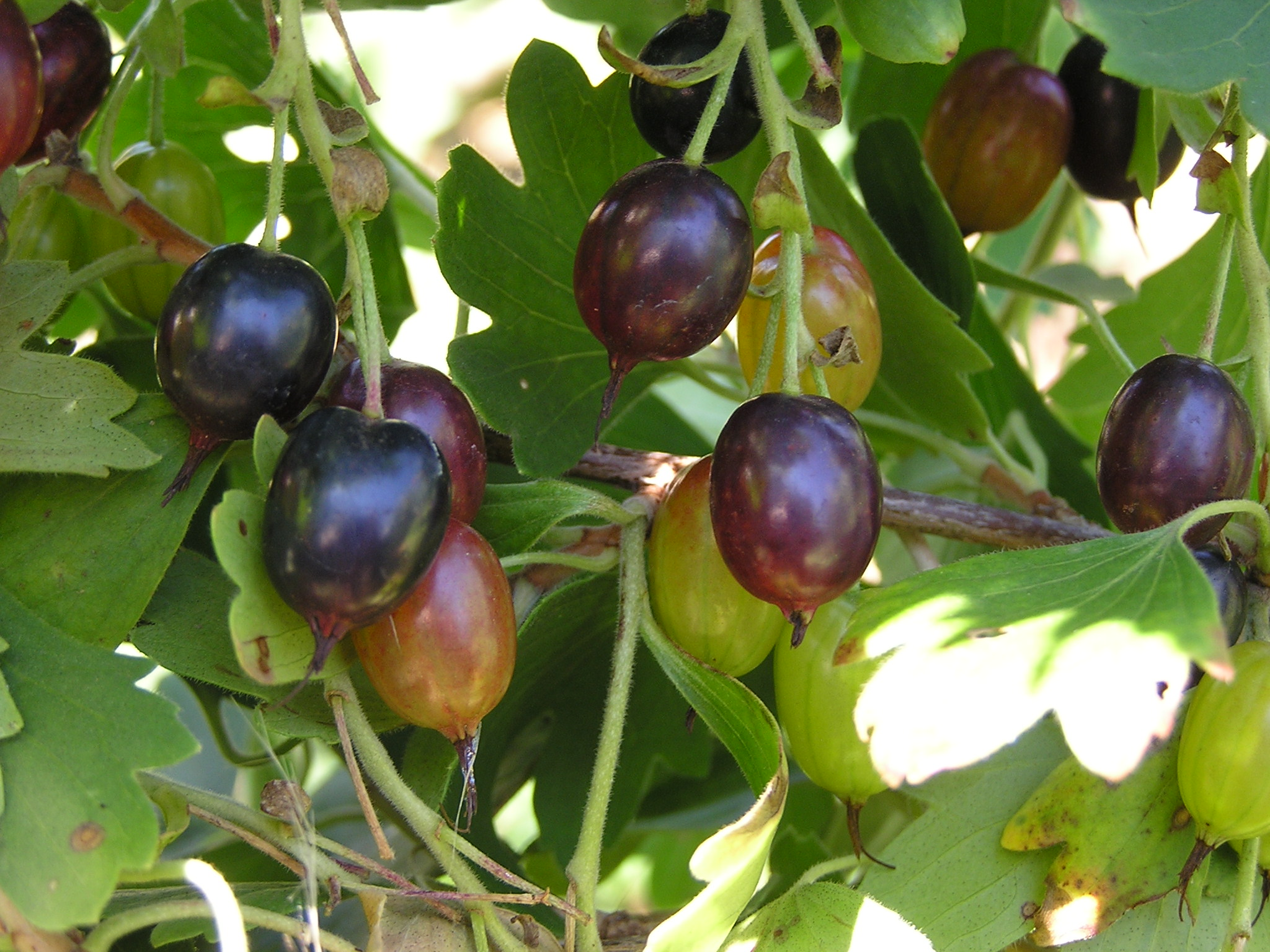
Berries close-up

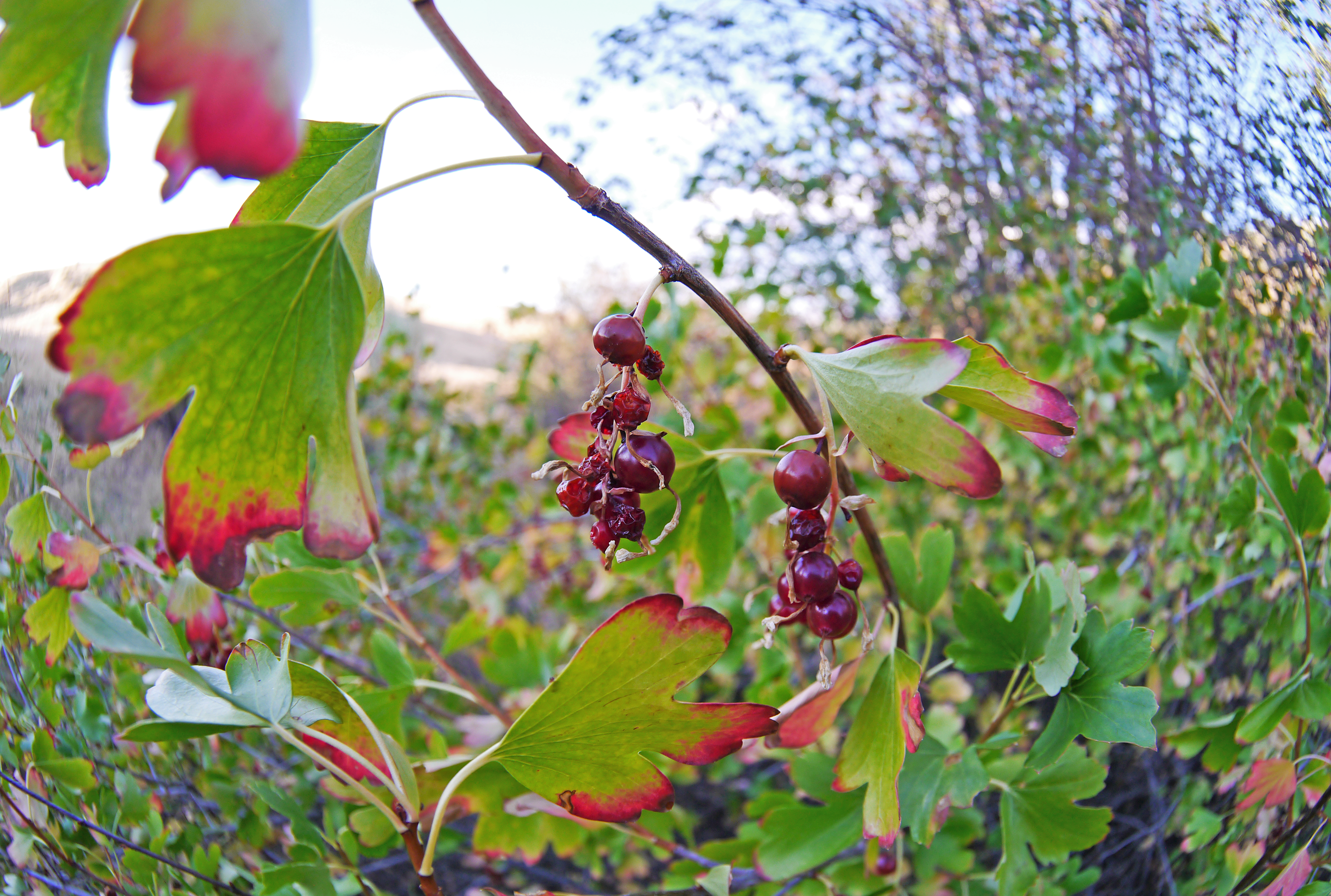
Berries of R. aureum var. aureum

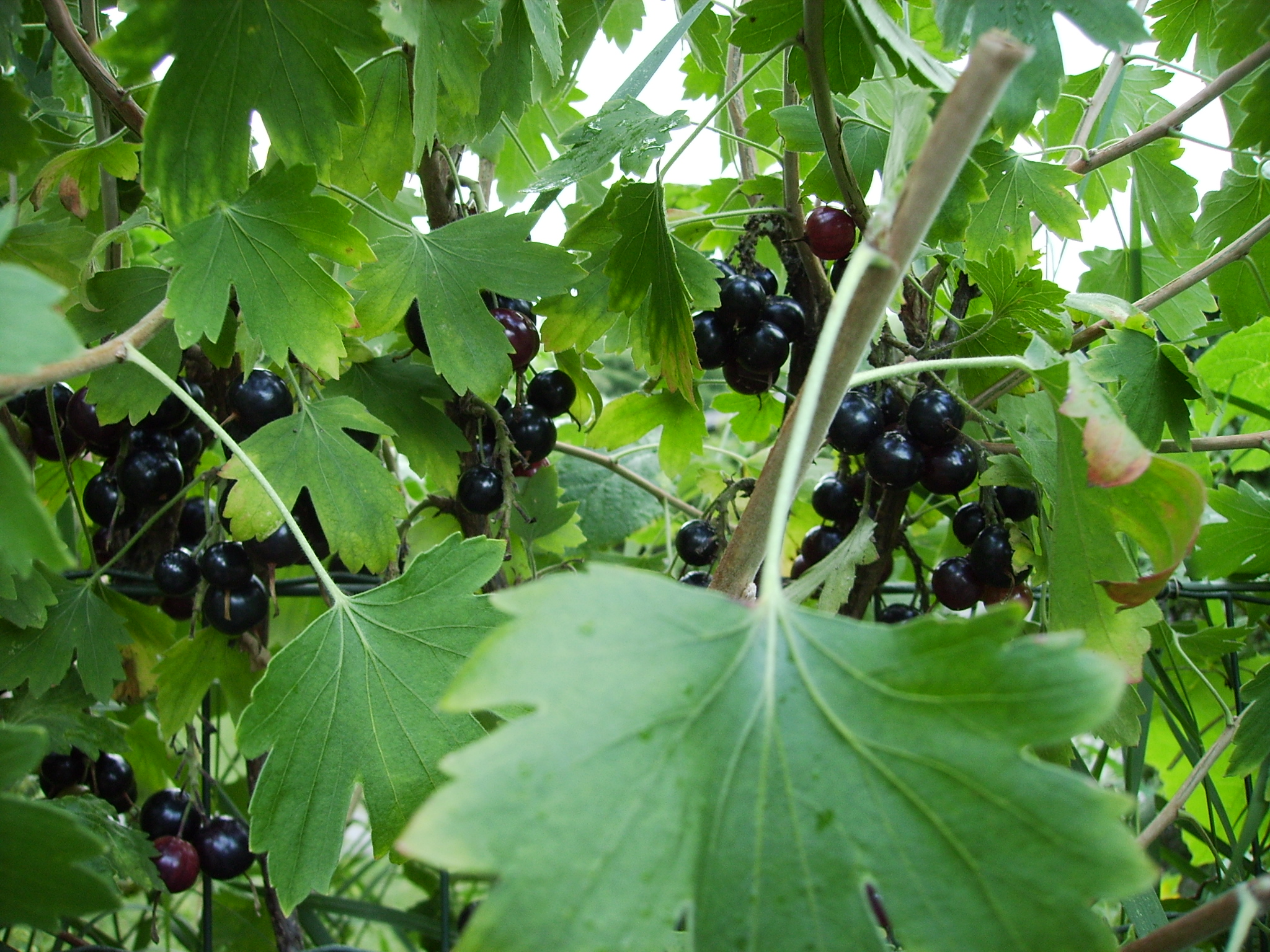
Berries of R. aureum var. villosum

== Taxonomy ==
The species belongs to the subgenus Ribes, which contains other currants such as the blackcurrant (R. nigrum) and redcurrant (R. rubrum), and is the sole member of the section Symphocalyx.

=== Varieties ===
- Ribes aureum var. aureum: below 910 m (3,000 ft) in the western U.S.
- Ribes aureum var. gracillimum: below 910 m (3,000 ft) in the California Coast Ranges
- Ribes aureum var. villosum – clove currant (syn: Ribes odoratum); native west of Mississippi River, but naturalized further to the east

== Distribution and habitat ==
Ribes aureum is native to Canada and the central United States west of the Mississippi River, but has escaped cultivation and naturalized in the eastern United States.

It can be found around gravel banks and plains around flowing water.

== Ecology ==
Pollinators of the plant include hummingbirds, butterflies and bees. The fruit is eaten by various birds and mammals.

This currant species is susceptible to white pine blister rust (Cronartium ribicola), a fungus which attacks and kills pines, so it is sometimes eradicated from forested areas where the fungus is active to prevent its spread.

== Cultivation ==
R. aureum is widely cultivated as an ornamental plant, in traditional, native plant, drought tolerant, and wildlife gardens, and natural landscaping projects. Named cultivars have been also introduced.

Although the flowers are hermaphroditic, the yield is greatly benefited by cross-pollination.

== Uses ==
The fruits are edible raw, but are very tart or bitter. They are usually cooked with sugar and can be made into jelly. The flowers are also edible.

The berries have been used for food, and other plant parts for medicine, by various Native American groups across its range in North America.
