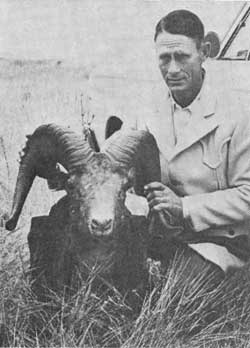
- Only known photo of a Badlands bighorn

Conservation status
- Extinct (1926)

Scientific classification
- Kingdom: Animalia
- Phylum: Chordata
- Class: Mammalia
- Infraclass: Placentalia
- Order: Artiodactyla
- Family: Bovidae
- Subfamily: Caprinae
- Genus: Ovis
- Species: O. canadensis
- Subspecies: †O. c. auduboni

Trinomial name
- †Ovis canadensis auduboni Merriam, 1901

= Badlands bighorn =

Extinct subspecies of bighorn sheep

The Badlands bighorn (Ovis canadensis auduboni), commonly known as Audubon's bighorn sheep, is an extinct subspecies or population of bighorn sheep of the northern Great Plains in North America. Its existence as a separate subspecies is disputed.

== Former distribution ==
While the one common name refers to the Badlands region of the Dakotas, it inhabited a larger range that included Montana, Wyoming, Nebraska, South Dakota, and North Dakota.

Some sources assert that the subspecies was hunted to extinction in the early 1900s. Others claim that the subspecies persisted as long as 1926.

Biologists Wehausen and Ramey assert that it was not a unique bighorn sheep subspecies but rather a variation of the widespread Rocky Mountain Bighorn (Ovis canadensis canadensis). Some later studies do not support the existence of the Badlands Bighorn as a distinct subspecies.

Rocky Mountain bighorn have replaced the subspecies/variation in its former habitats.
