= Salvia stibalii =

Scientific classification
- Kingdom: Plantae
- Clade: Tracheophytes
- Clade: Angiosperms
- Clade: Eudicots
- Clade: Asterids
- Order: Lamiales
- Family: Lamiaceae
- Genus: Salvia
- Species: S. stibalii

Binomial name
- Salvia stibalii Alziar

Synonyms
- Salvia pauciflora E.Peter, nom. illeg.; Salvia wuana C.L.Xiang, nom. superfl.

Species of flowering plant

Salvia stibalii, synonym Salvia pauciflora E.Peter, is a perennial plant that is native to Yunnan province in China, growing in and around forests at 2,800 to 3,400 m (9,200 to 11,200 ft) elevation.

== Description ==
Salvia stibalii grows on 2–4 slender unbranched stems with widely spaced leaves. The leaves are broadly ovate to ovate-triangular, typically ranging in size from 2.5 to 6 cm (0.98 to 2.36 in) long and 1.2 to 5 cm (0.47 to 1.97 in) wide. The inflorescences are of racemes or panicles that are 2 to 8 cm (0.79 to 3.15 in), with a corolla that is purplish red or purple-white (rarely purplish), with white spotting on the lower lip. The corolla is 1.3 to 2 cm (0.51 to 0.79 in), rarely a bit longer.
