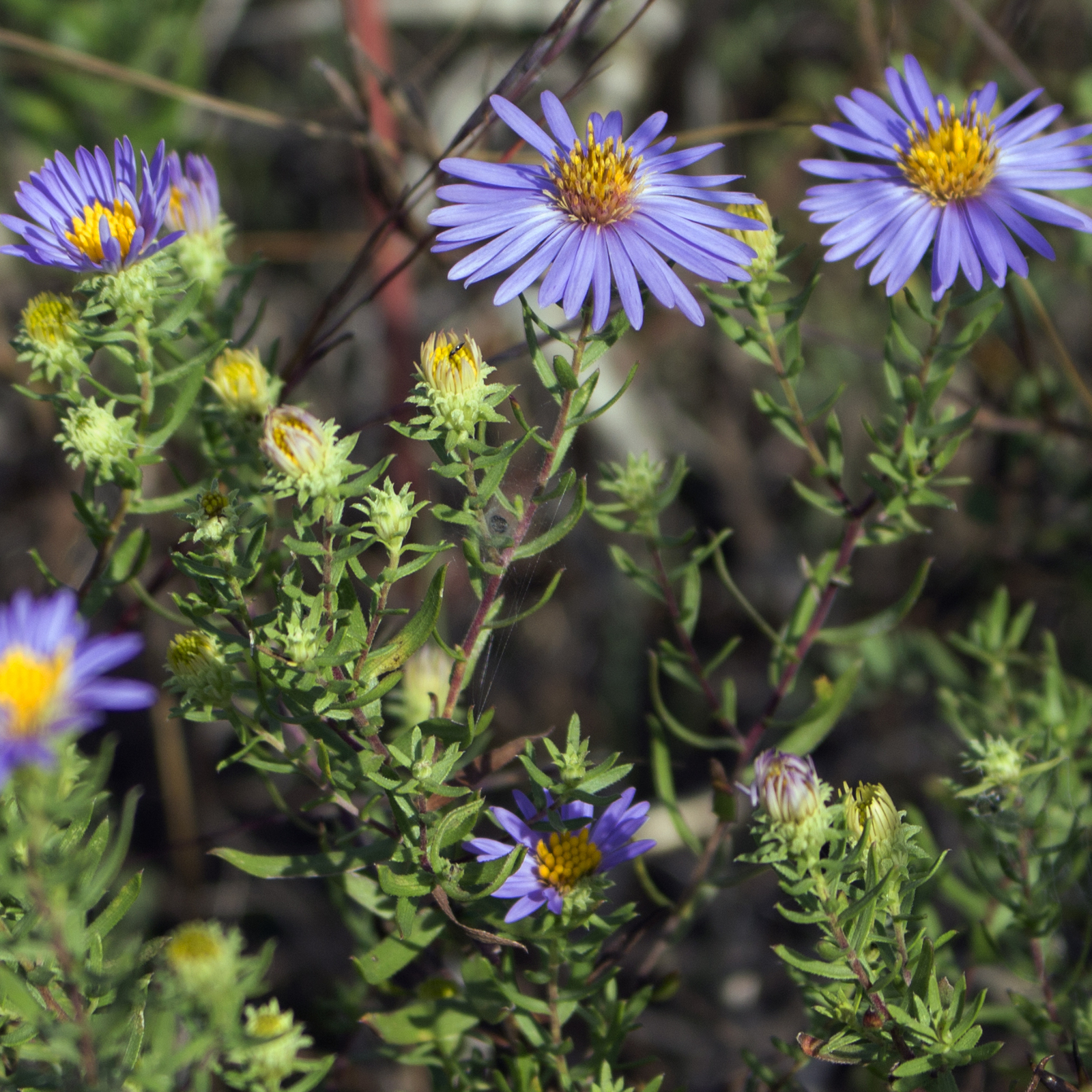

Conservation status
- Secure (NatureServe)

Scientific classification
- Kingdom: Plantae
- Clade: Tracheophytes
- Clade: Angiosperms
- Clade: Eudicots
- Clade: Asterids
- Order: Asterales
- Family: Asteraceae
- Genus: Symphyotrichum
- Subgenus: Symphyotrichum subg. Virgulus
- Section: Symphyotrichum sect. Grandiflori
- Species: S. oblongifolium

Binomial name
- Symphyotrichum oblongifolium (Nutt.) G.L.Nesom
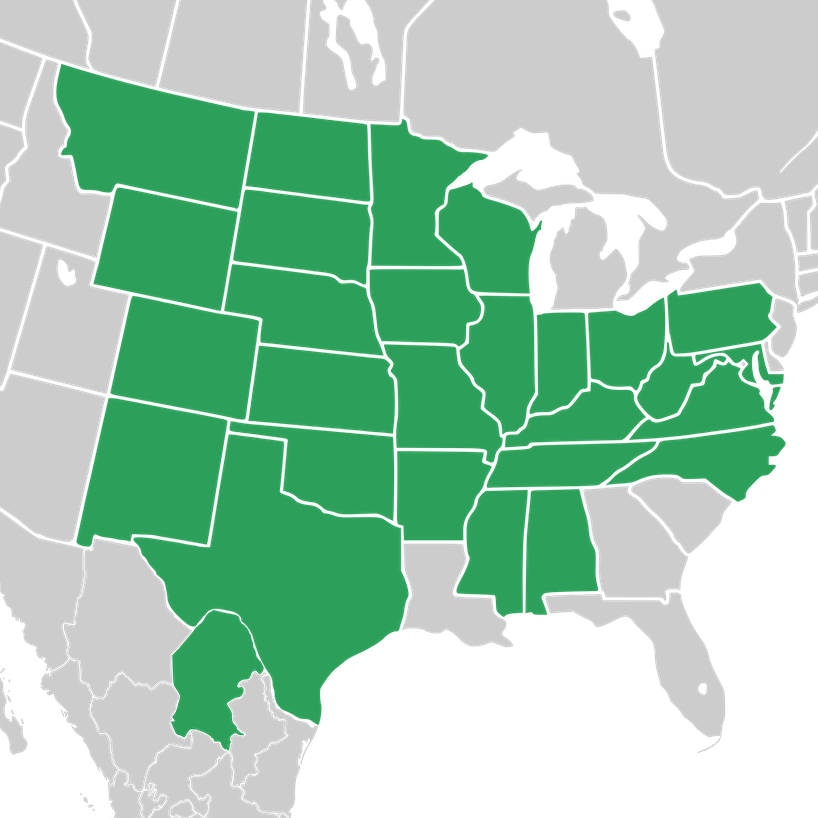
- Native distribution

Synonyms
- Basionym: Aster oblongifolius Nutt.; Alphabetical list: Aster graveolens Nutt.; Aster kumleini Fr. ex A.Gray; Aster kumleinii Fr. ex Burgess; Aster kumleinii var. oliganthemos Lunell; Aster kumleinii f. roseoligulatus Benke; Aster multiceps Lindl.; Aster oblongifolius f. albaligulatus Magrath; Aster oblongifolius var. angustatus Shinners; Aster oblongifolius var. orientis Shinners; Aster oblongifolius var. rigidulus A.Gray; Aster oblongifolius f. roseoligulatus (Benke) Shinners; Aster oblongifolius f. roseus Shinners; Lasallea oblongifolia (Nutt.) Semple & Brouillet; Virgulus oblongifolius (Nutt.) Reveal & Keener; Virgulus oblongifolius var. angustatus (Shinners) Reveal & Keener

= Symphyotrichum oblongifolium =

Species of flowering plant in the aster family

Symphyotrichum oblongifolium (formerly Aster oblongifolius), commonly known as aromatic aster or oblong-leaved aster, is a species of flowering plant in the family Asteraceae and is native to parts of the eastern and central United States. It is an uncommon herbaceous perennial that reaches heights of 10–80 centimeters (4–31 inches) and blooms August–November with many flower heads in various shades of purple.

== Description ==
Aromatic aster is a perennial, herbaceous flowering plant that reaches heights of 10–80 centimeters (4–31 inches) on one to ten or more stems growing from a sturdy caudex. It blooms August–November with many flower heads in various shades of purple.

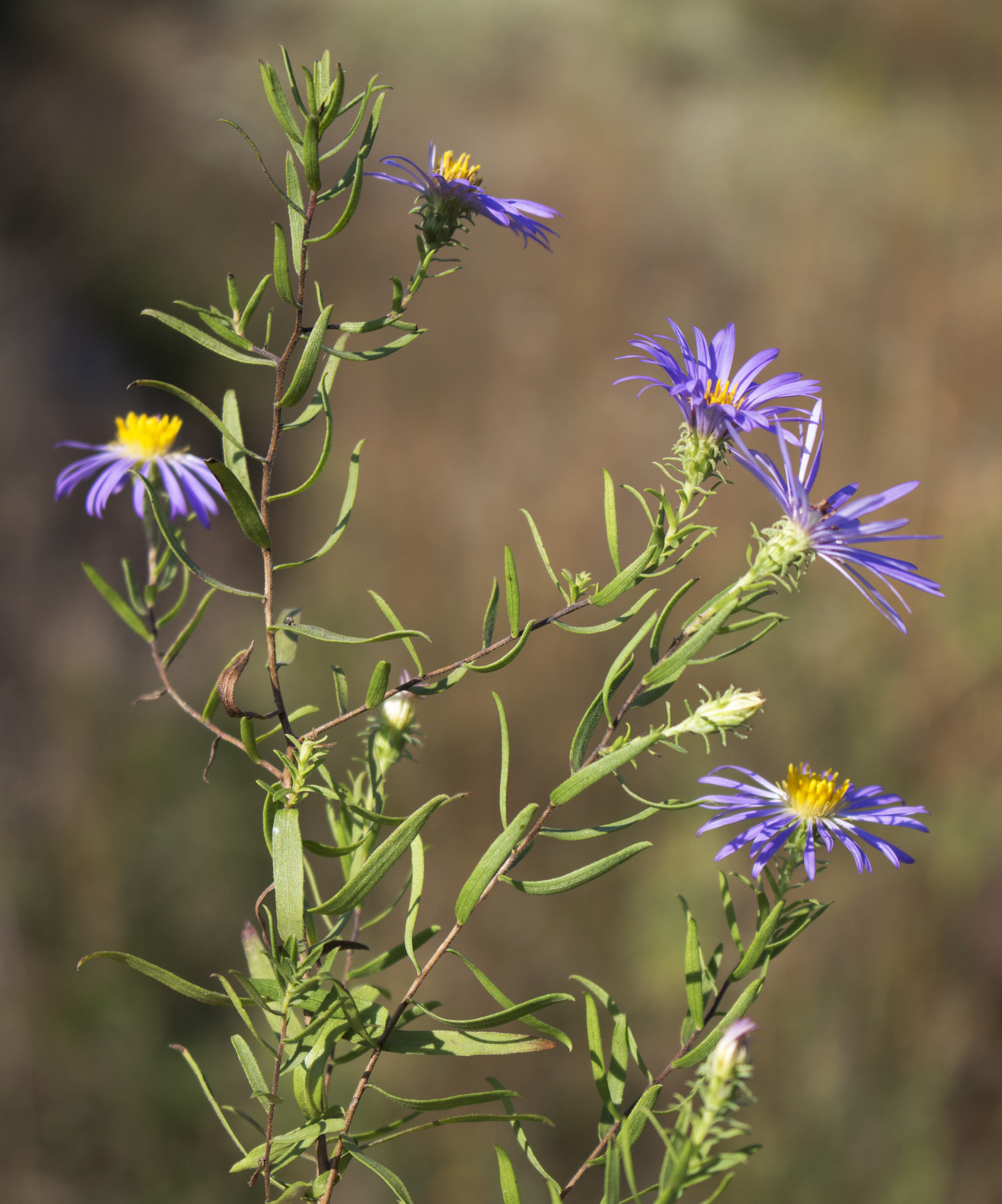

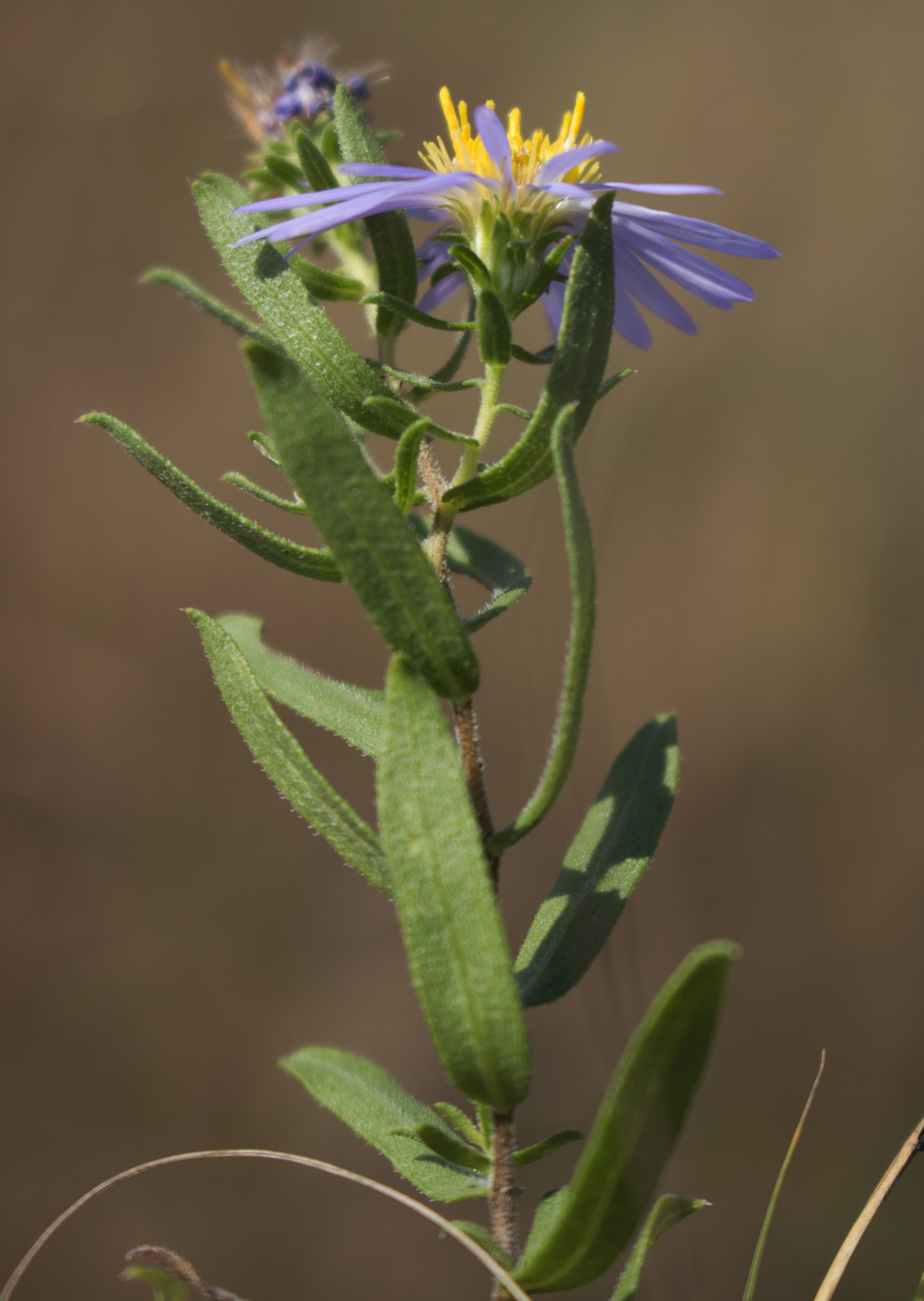

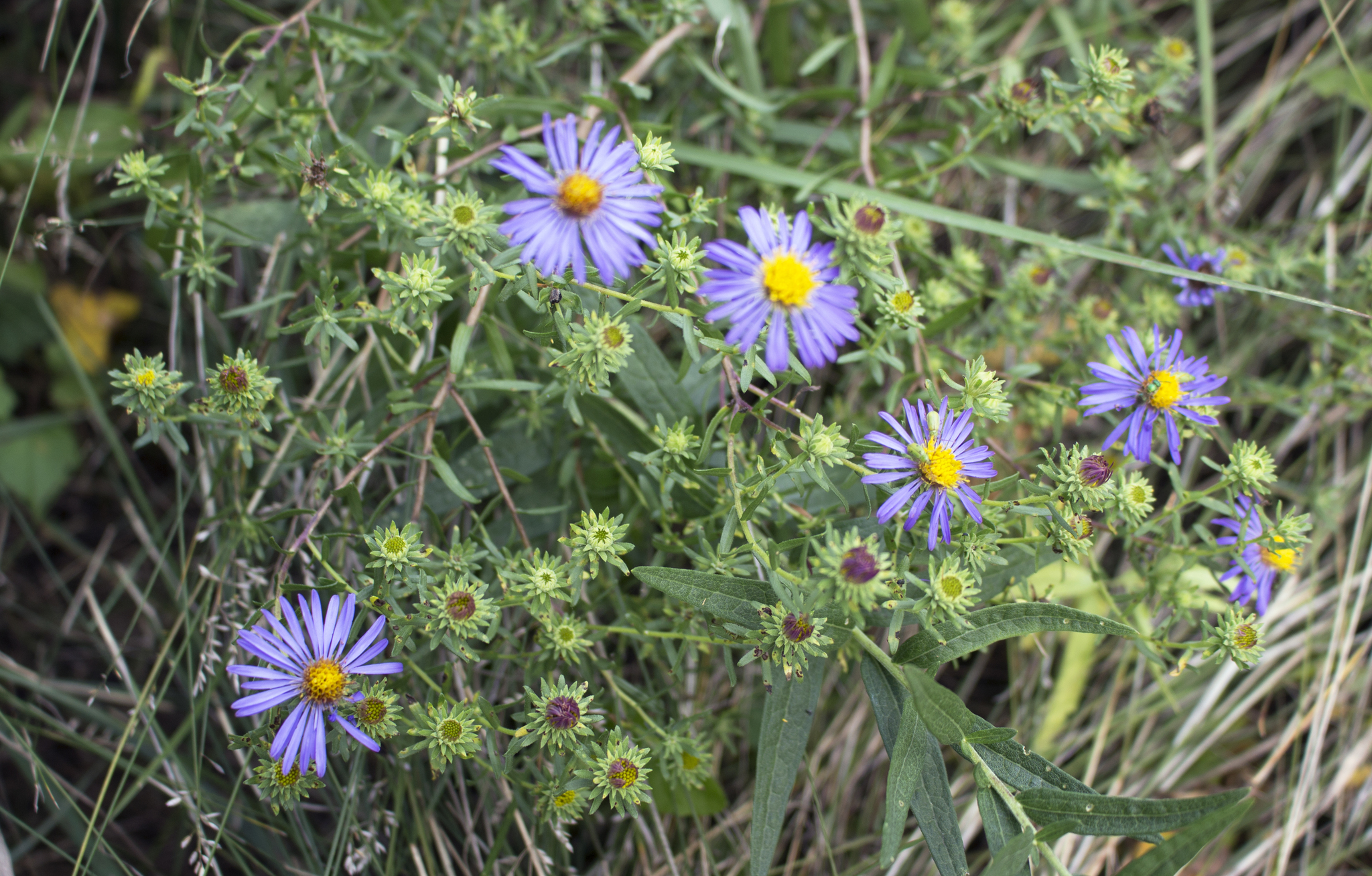

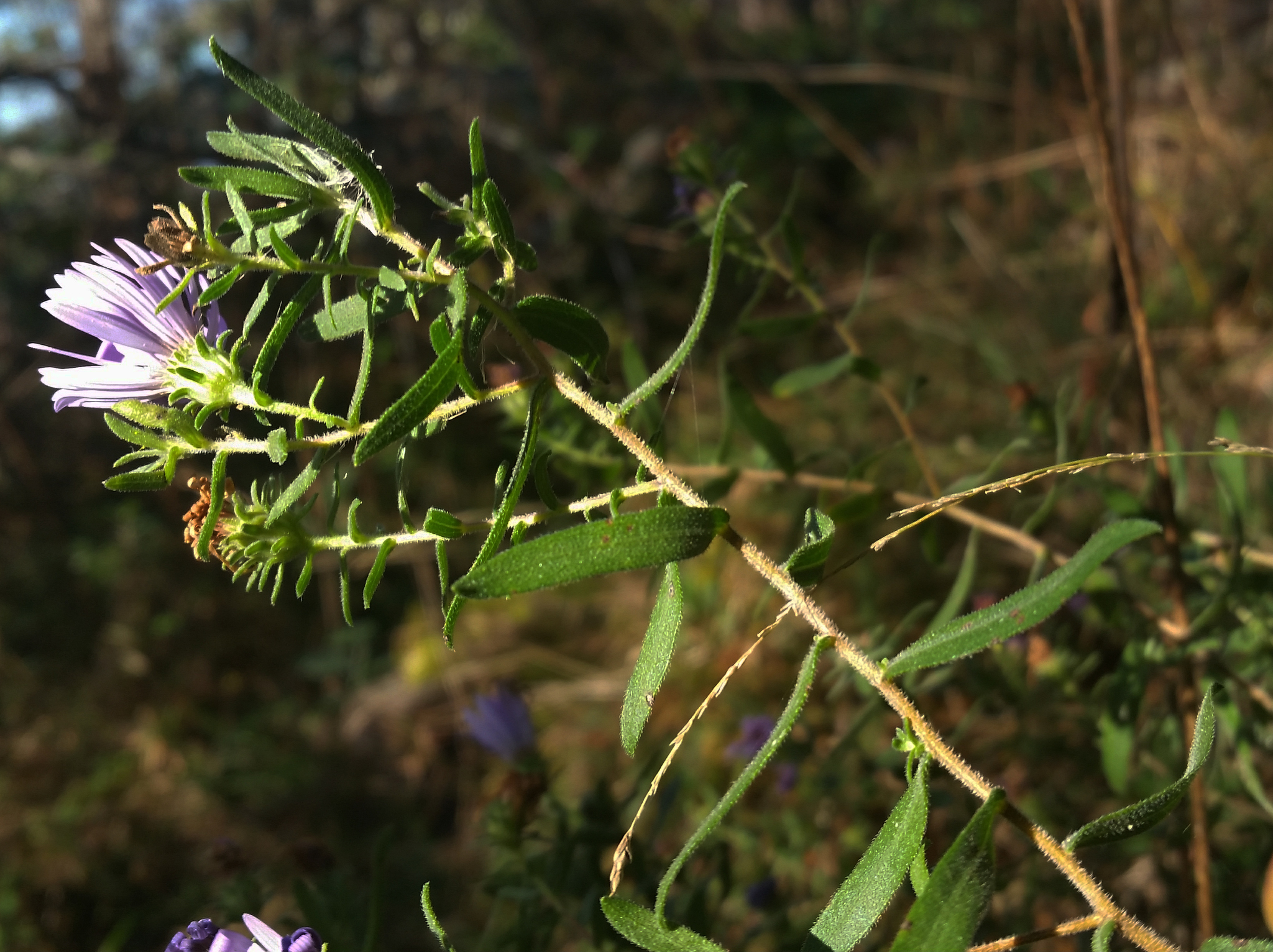

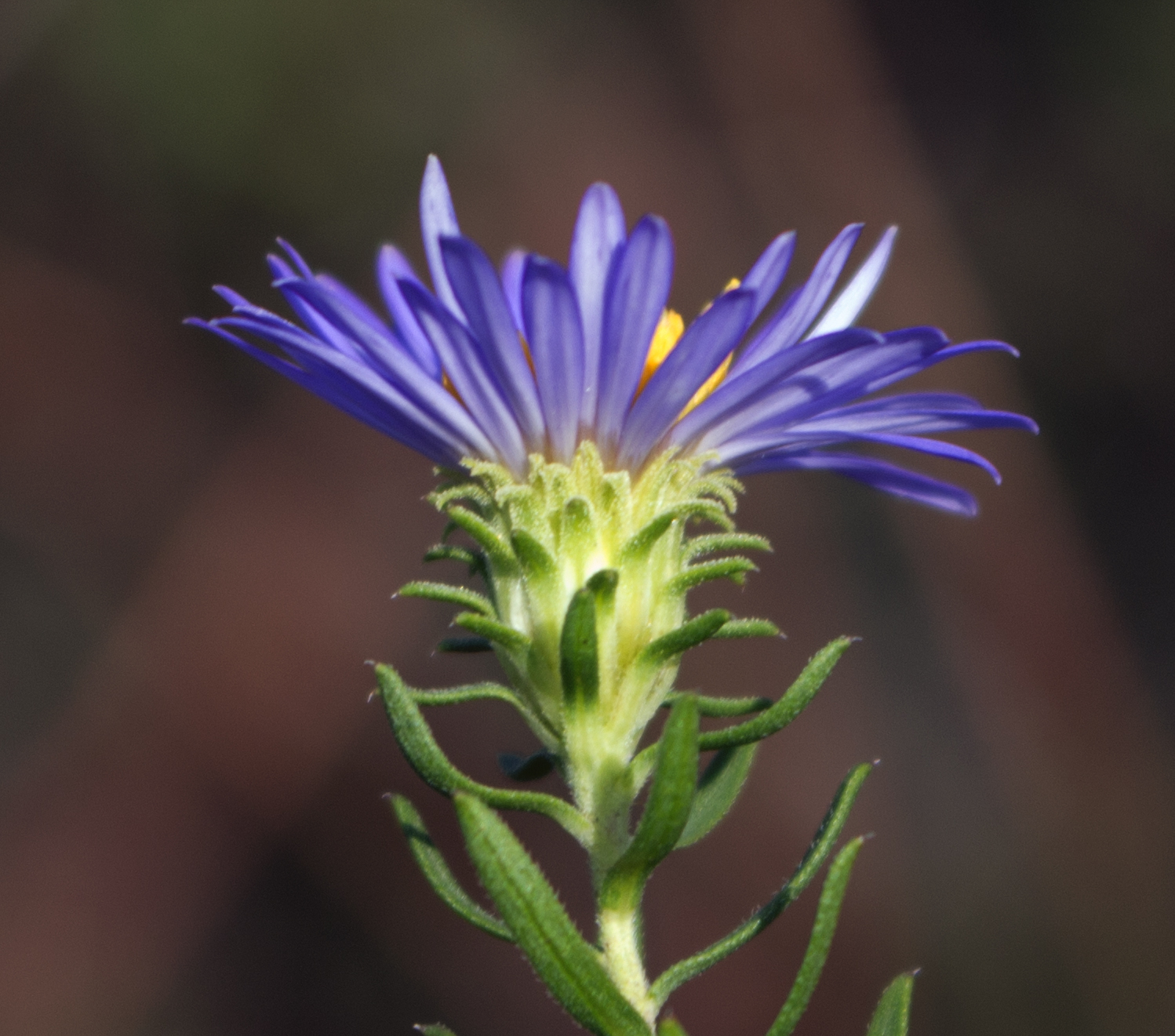

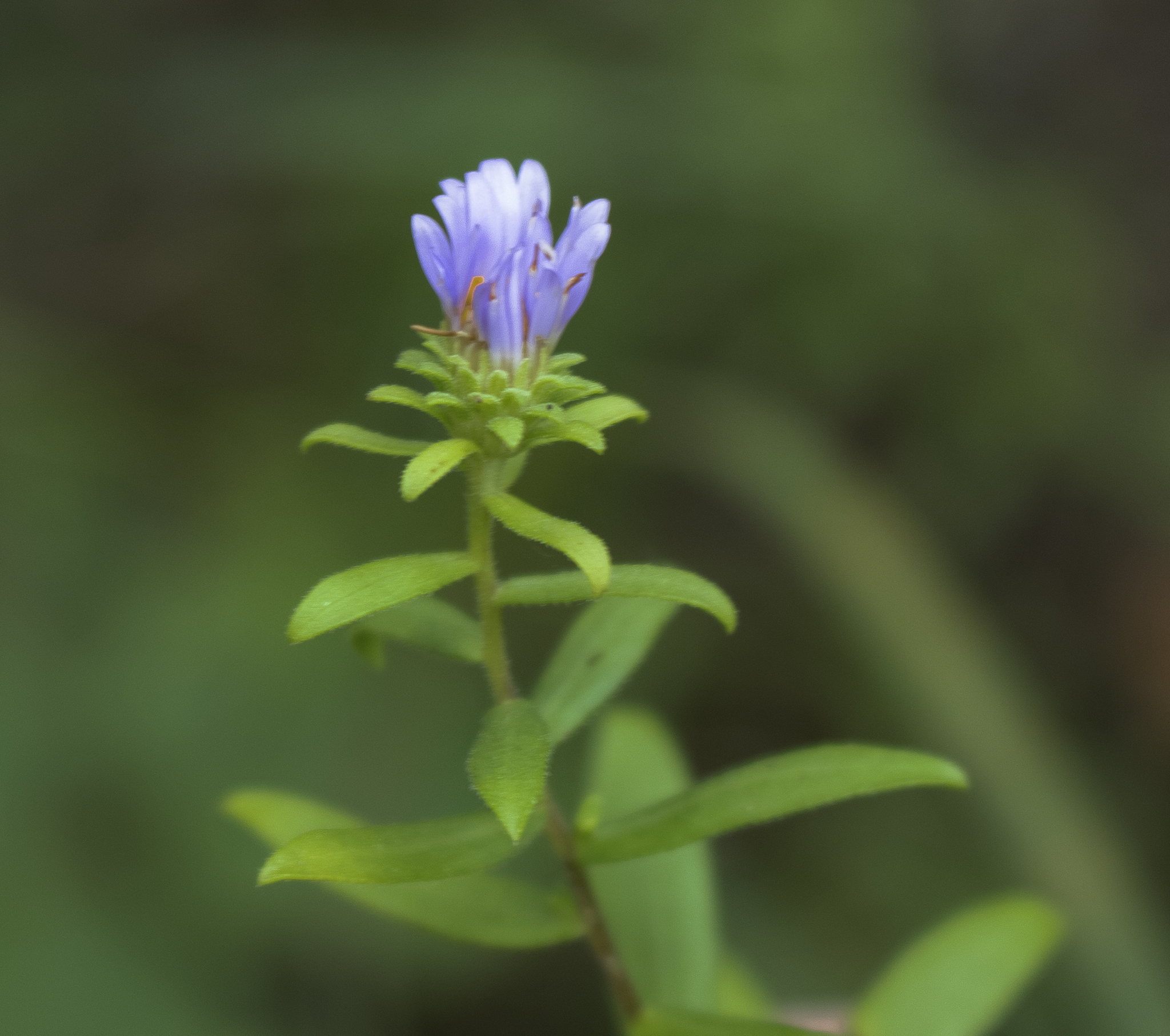

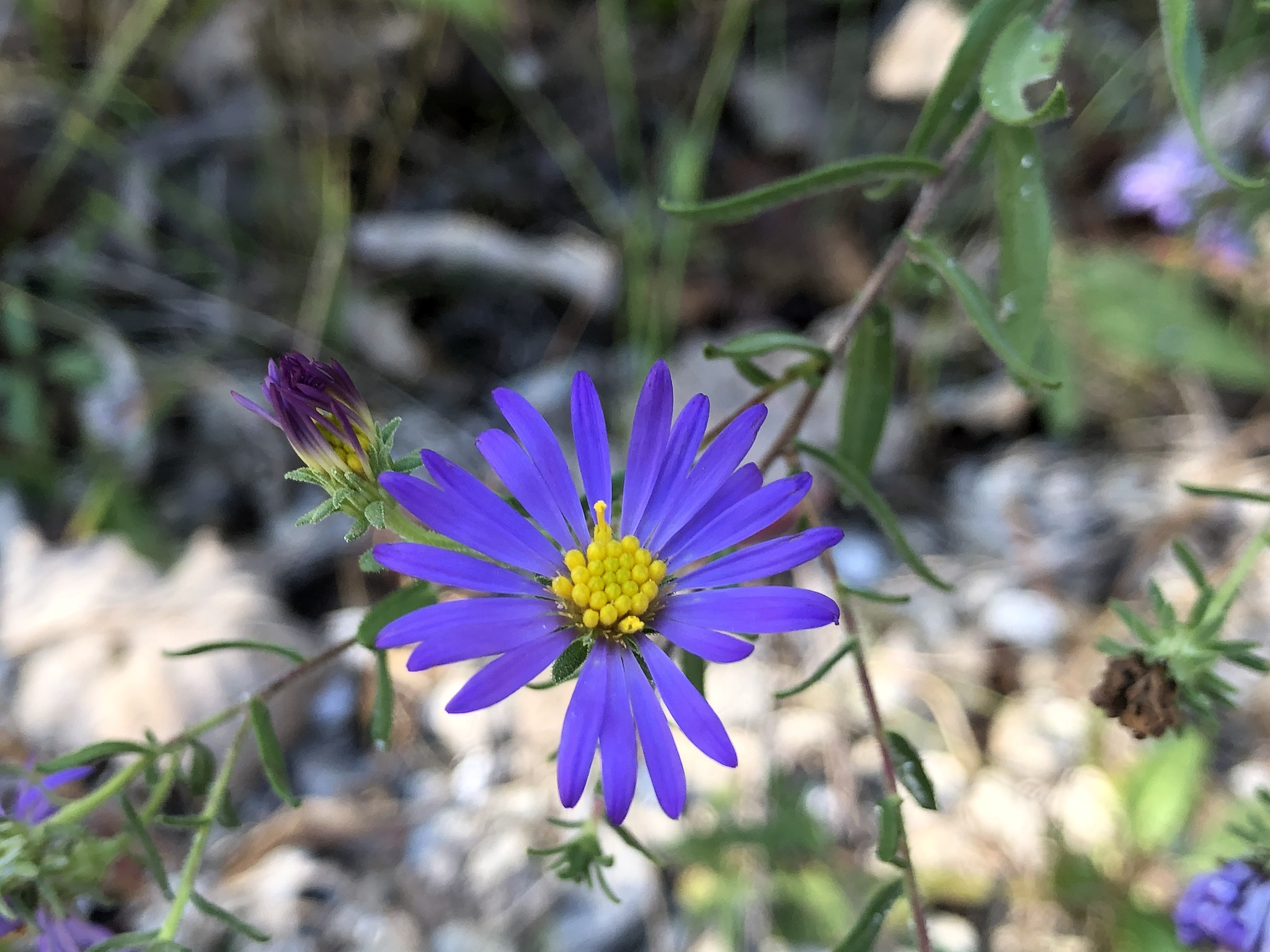

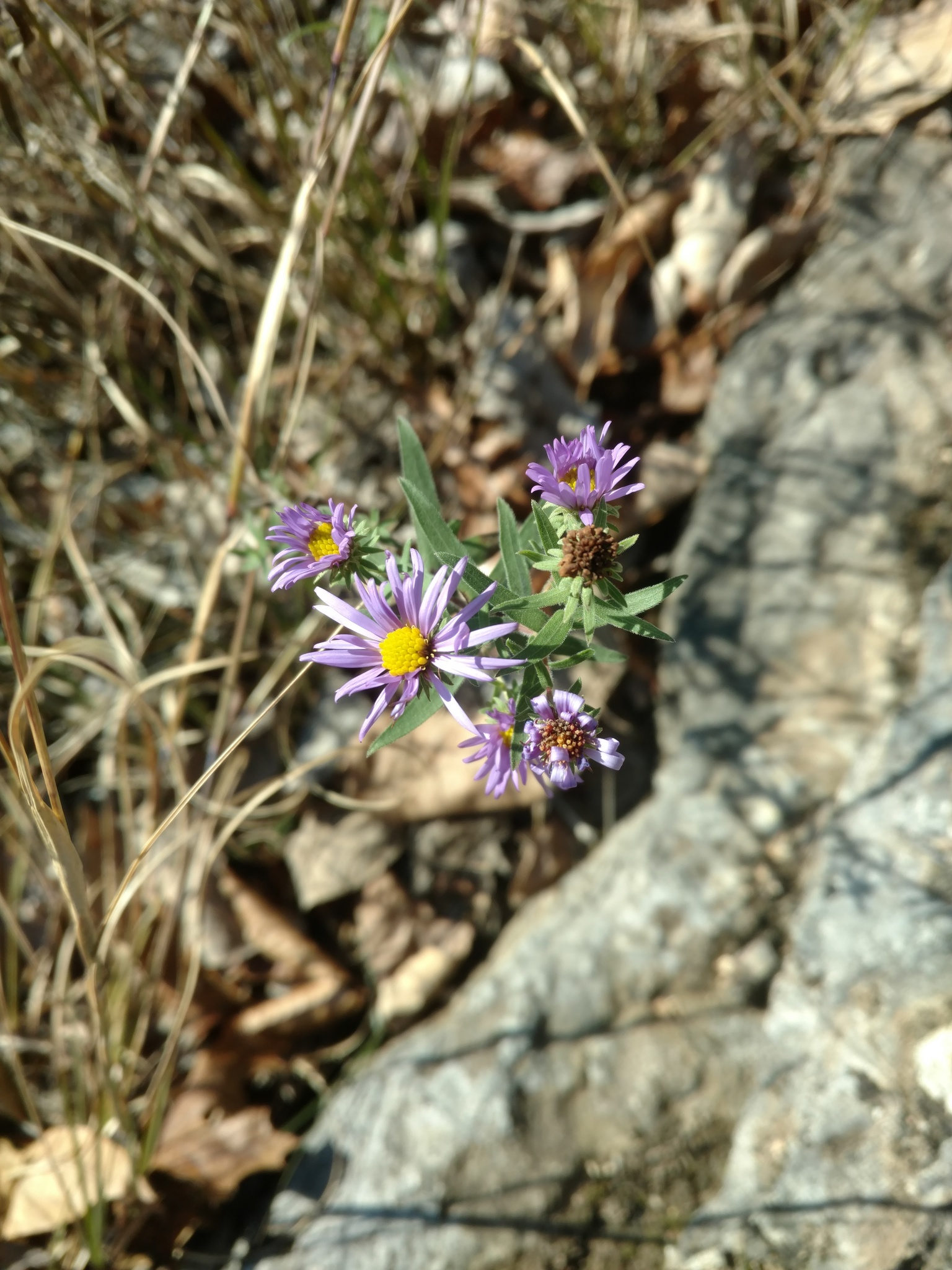

== Distribution and habitat ==
Aromatic aster is found in parts of Kansas, Ohio, northern Illinois, hilly parts of southern Illinois, and on the banks of the Mississippi River and Illinois River, as well as other parts of the central United States. It is found in Missouri, along the Ohio River, and from Pennsylvania to Nebraska to Minnesota to Virginia.

== Conservation ==
As of July 2021, NatureServe listed Symphyotrichum oblongifolium as Secure (G5) worldwide; Critically Imperiled (S1) in Colorado and North Carolina; Imperiled (S2) in Wyoming; and, Vulnerable (S3) in Indiana and Ohio.
