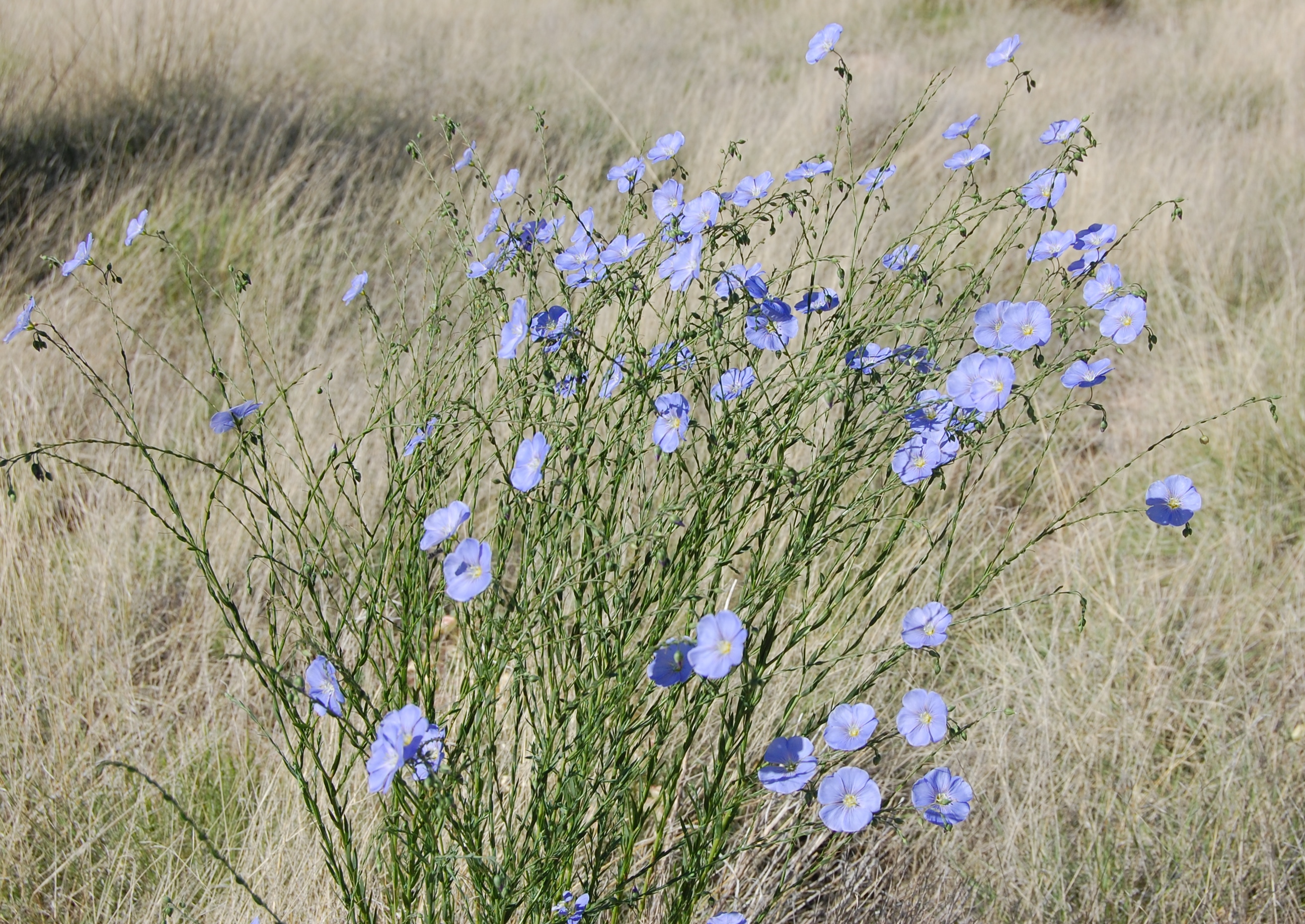
- In Elena Gallegos Picnic Area, Albuquerque, NM

Conservation status
- Secure (NatureServe)

Scientific classification
- Kingdom: Plantae
- Clade: Tracheophytes
- Clade: Angiosperms
- Clade: Eudicots
- Clade: Rosids
- Order: Malpighiales
- Family: Linaceae
- Genus: Linum
- Species: L. lewisii

Binomial name
- Linum lewisii Pursh

Varieties
- Linum lewisii var. alpicola Jeps.; Linum lewisii var. lepagei (B.Boivin) C.M.Rogers; Linum lewisii var. lewisii

Synonyms
- List: Adenolinum lewisii (Pursh) Á.Löve & D.Löve; Linum perenne var. lewisii (Pursh) Eaton & Wright; Linum perenne subsp. lewisii (Pursh) Hultén; Linum sibiricum var. lewisii (Pursh) Lindl.

= Linum lewisii =

Plant species in the flax family

Linum lewisii (Linum perenne var. lewisii) (Lewis flax, blue flax or prairie flax) is a perennial plant in the family Linaceae, native to western North America.

== Description ==
It is a slender herbaceous plant growing to 80 centimetres (31 1/2 inches) tall, with spirally arranged narrow lanceolate leaves 1–3 cm (1/2–1 1/4 in) long. The flowers are pale blue or lavender to white, often veined in darker blue, with five petals 1–1.5 cm long and in varying length styles. The flowers open in the morning and fade, dropping their petals by noon on hot, sunny days.

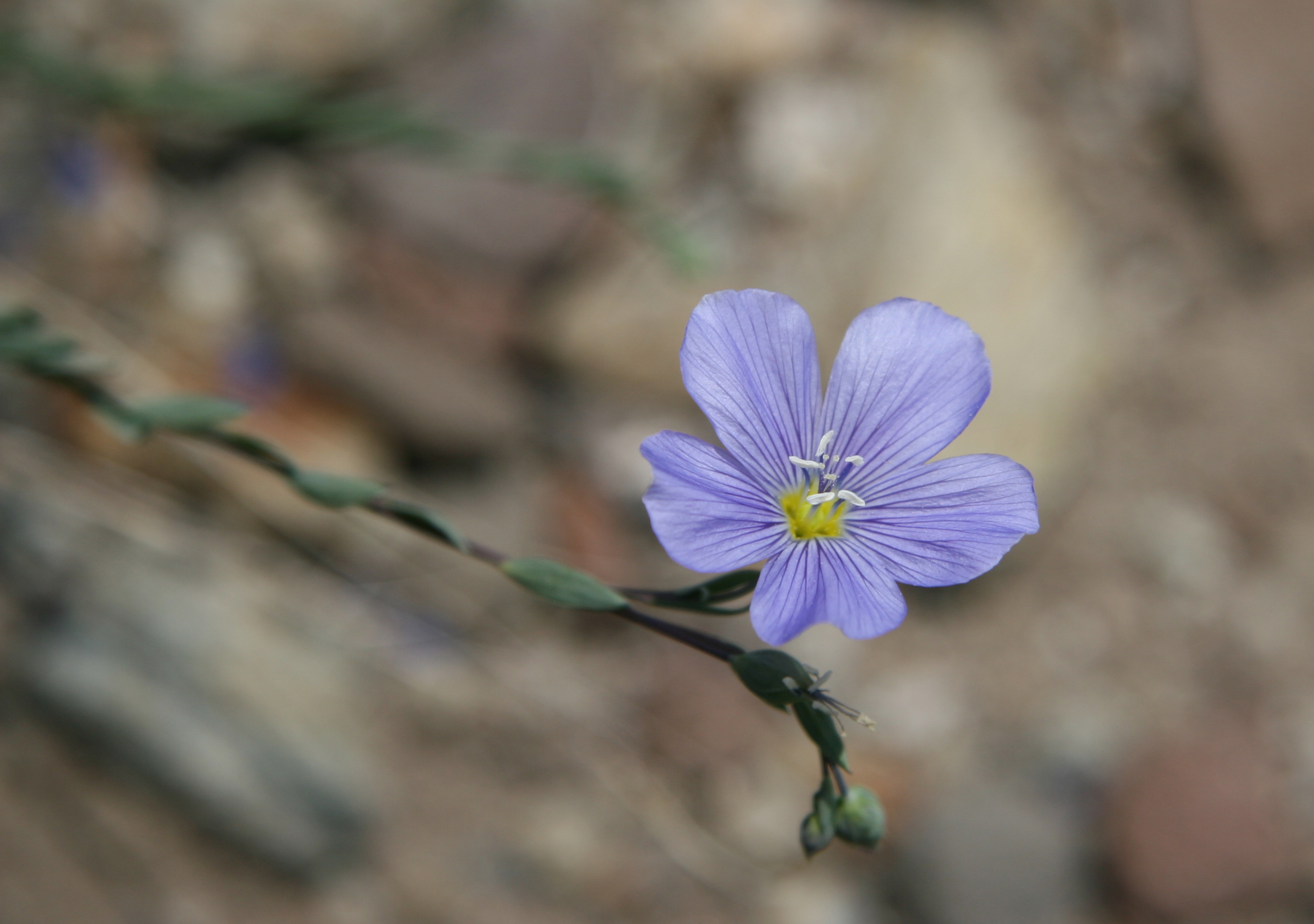
The inflorescence is a terminal open raceme.

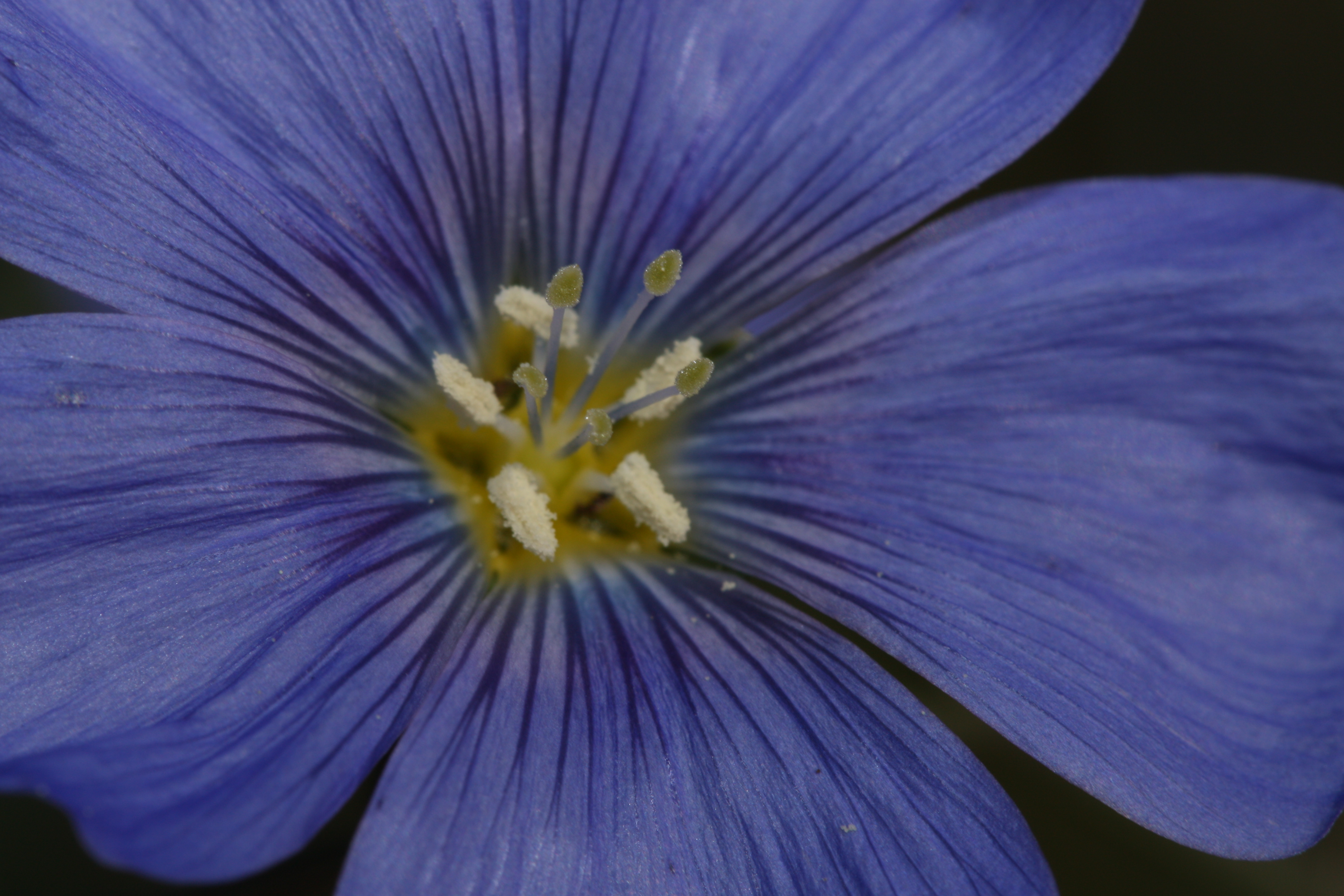
A lavender flower

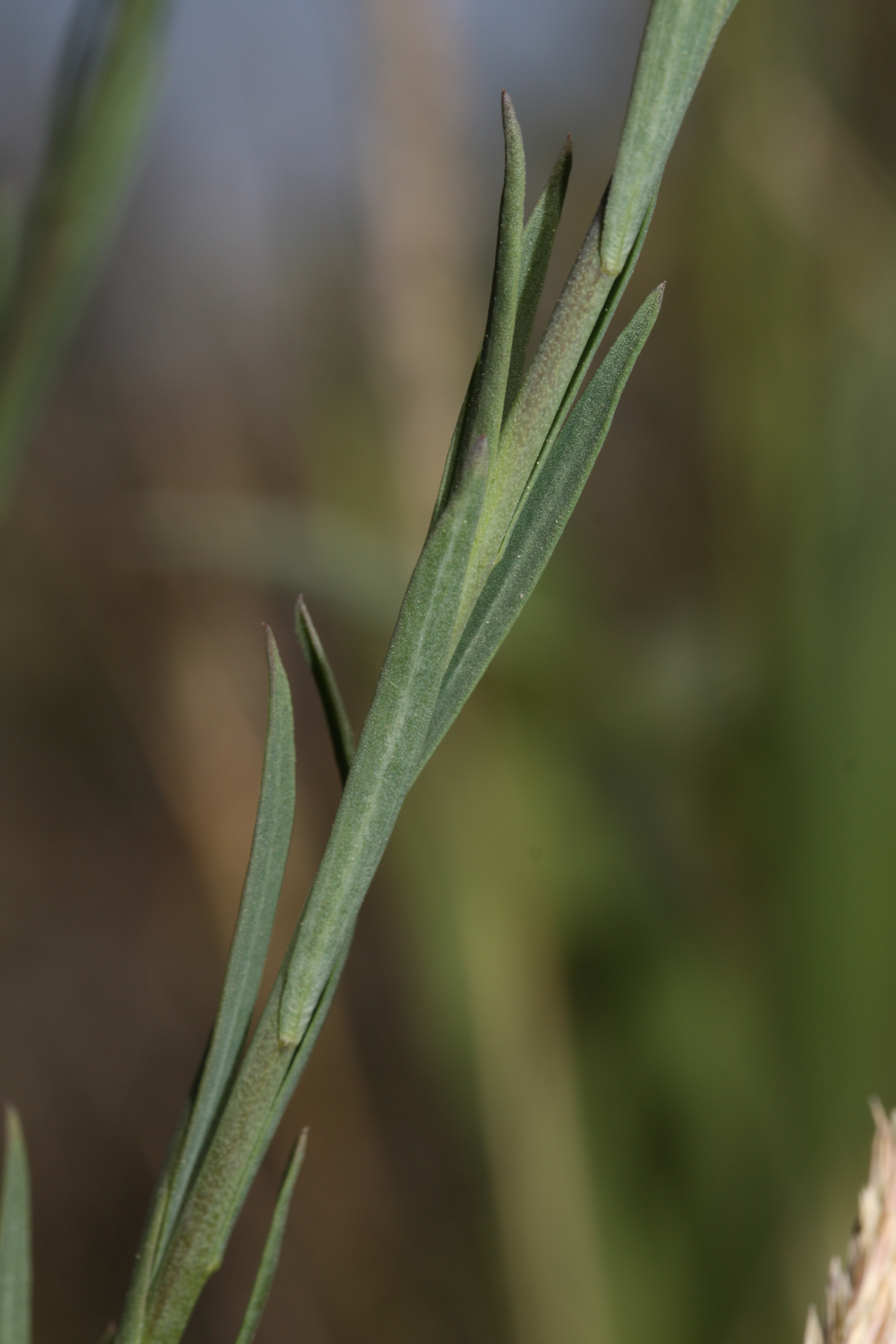
The spirally arranged lanceolate leaves

== Etymology ==
The species was named for North American explorer Meriwether Lewis.

== Distribution and habitat ==
The plant is native to western North America from Alaska south to Baja California, and from the Pacific Coast east to the Mississippi River. It grows on ridges and dry slopes, from sea level in the north up to 11,000 feet (3,400 metres) in the Sierra Nevada.

== Cultivation ==
Blue flax is a durable wildflower in garden conditions, never becoming overly aggressive towards other plants. Plants are easily grown from seed. Blue flax grows well in lean soils without much organic matter and are healthier in well-drained soils.
