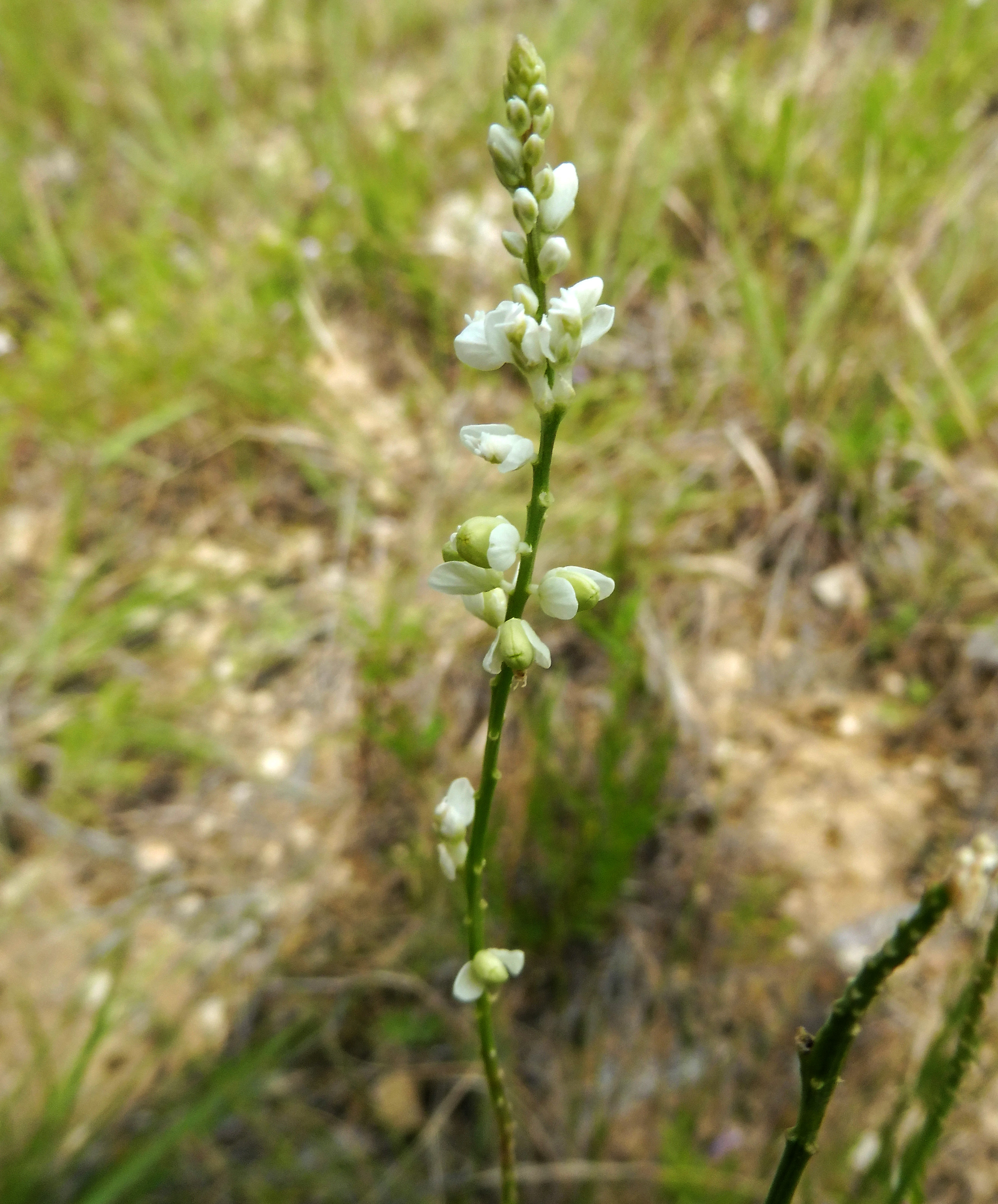

Conservation status
- Secure (NatureServe)

Scientific classification
- Kingdom: Plantae
- Clade: Embryophytes
- Clade: Tracheophytes
- Clade: Angiosperms
- Clade: Eudicots
- Clade: Rosids
- Order: Fabales
- Family: Polygalaceae
- Genus: Senega
- Species: S. alba

Binomial name
- Senega alba (Nutt.) J.F.B.Pastore & J.R.Abbott

Synonyms
- Asemeia alba (Nutt.) Raf.; Polygala alba Nutt.

= Senega alba =

Plant species in the milkwort family

Senega alba, commonly called white milkwort, is a species of flowering plant in the milkwort family.

== Description ==
It is an erect perennial, reaching 45 cm (18 in) tall. It produces small white flowers, distributed in an elongated raceme. It flowers in late spring and early summer.

== Taxonomy ==
This species was first named Polygala alba, placing it in the Polygala genus by Thomas Nuttall in 1818. It was suggested that it be moved to Asemeia by Constantine Samuel Rafinesque in 1838, but its accepted name was published in 2023 by José Floriano Barêa Pastore and J. Richard Abbott when they placed it in Senega. Together with its genus it is classified in the Polygalaceae family and it has 15 synonyms.

Table of Synonyms
| Name | Year | Rank | Notes |
|---|---|---|---|
| Asemeia alba (Nutt.) Raf. | 1838 | species | ≡ hom. |
| Asemeia leptopsis Raf. | 1838 | species | = het. |
| Polygala alba Nutt. | 1818 | species | ≡ hom. |
| Polygala alba var. brachystachya Chodat | 1893 | variety | = het. |
| Polygala alba var. leptostachya Chodat | 1893 | variety | = het. |
| Polygala alba var. mexicana Chodat | 1893 | variety | = het. |
| Polygala alba var. schaffneri Chodat | 1893 | variety | = het. |
| Polygala alba var. suspecta S.Watson | 1886 | variety | = het. |
| Polygala alba var. tenuifolia (Pursh) S.F.Blake | 1916 | variety | = het. |
| Polygala beyrichii Torr. & A.Gray | 1838 | species | = het. |
| Polygala hemipterocarpa var. bracteata Chodat | 1893 | variety | = het. |
| Polygala jamesii Raf. | 1832 | species | = het., nom. illeg. superfl. |
| Polygala scoparia Benth. | 1839 | species | = het., nom. illeg. homonym. post. |
| Polygala senega var. tenuifolia Pursh | 1813 | variety | = het. |
| Polygala torreyi G.Don | 1831 | species | = het. |
Notes: ≡ homotypic synonym; = heterotypic synonym

== Distribution ==
It is native to North America, where it is found in Canada, Mexico, and the United States. In the United States, its range is concentrated in the Great Plains and the Southwest. Its natural habitat is in rocky or sandy dry prairies.
