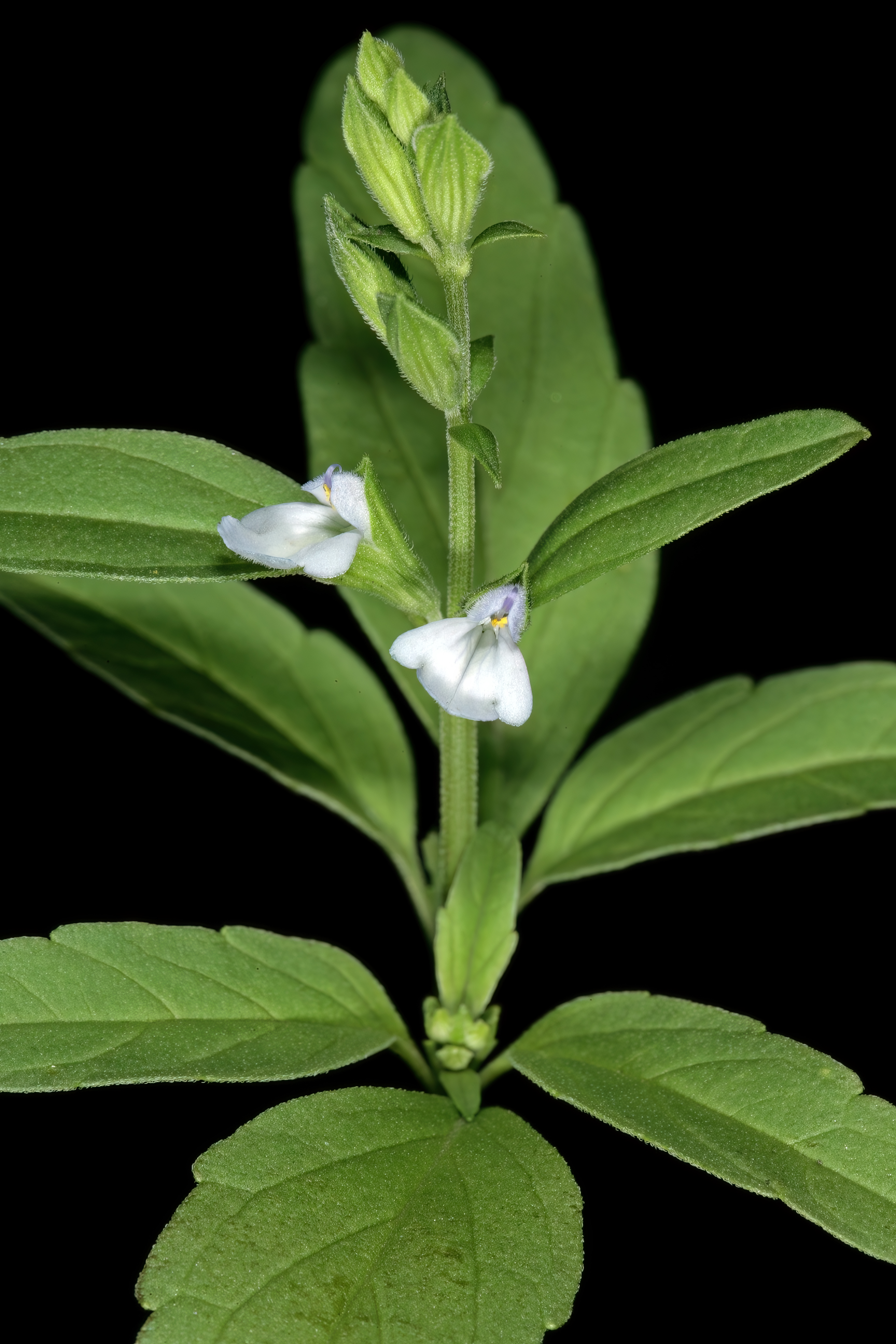

Conservation status
- Secure (NatureServe)

Scientific classification
- Kingdom: Plantae
- Clade: Tracheophytes
- Clade: Angiosperms
- Clade: Eudicots
- Clade: Asterids
- Order: Lamiales
- Family: Lamiaceae
- Genus: Salvia
- Species: S. reflexa

Binomial name
- Salvia reflexa Hornem.

Synonyms
- Salvia aspidophylla Schult.; Salvia pauciflora Kunth; Salvia trichostemoides Pursh

= Salvia reflexa =

Plant species in the mint family

Salvia reflexa, the lanceleaf sage, Rocky Mountain sage, blue sage, lambsleaf sage, sage mint or mintweed, is an annual subshrub native to the United States and Mexico and introduced to Argentina, Australia, Canada, South Africa and New Zealand.

It reaches 4-28 inches (10–71 cm) in height with small, opposite, lanceolate to narrowly elliptic leaves up to two inches (5 cm) long. The flowers grow in whorls, and are pale blue to dark blue and bloom from Summer to Autumn. Salvia reflexa is found in pastures and prairies and can be toxic to cattle, sheep and goats due to its accumulation of nitrates. Poisoning is not common, and reported cases are limited to animals eating contaminated hay. Symptoms of toxicity are muscular weakness, diarrhea, and colic.
