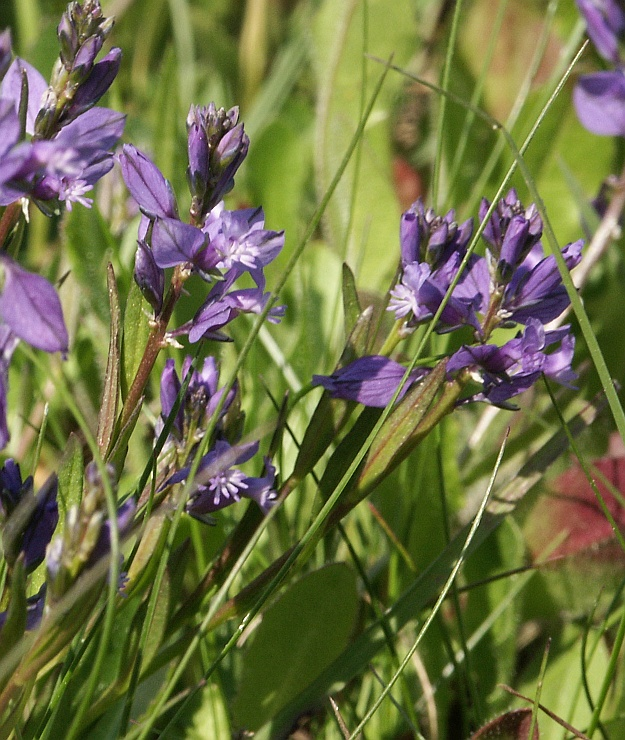
- Polygala vulgaris

Scientific classification
- Kingdom: Plantae
- Clade: Tracheophytes
- Clade: Angiosperms
- Clade: Eudicots
- Clade: Rosids
- Order: Fabales
- Family: Polygalaceae
- Tribe: Polygaleae
- Genus: Polygala; Tourn. ex L.

Type species
- Polygala vulgaris L.

Species
- See text

Synonyms
- List: Brachytropis Rchb.; Isolophus Spach; Microlophium Fourr.; Phylax Noronha; Pilostachys Raf.; Plostaxis Raf.; Psychanthus Raf.; Tricholophus Spach

= Polygala =

Genus of flowering plants

Polygala is a large genus of flowering plants belonging to the family Polygalaceae. They are commonly known as milkworts or snakeroots. The genus is distributed widely throughout much of the world in temperate zones and the tropics. The genus name Polygala comes from the ancient Greek "much milk", as the plant was thought to increase milk yields in cattle.

== Description ==
As traditionally circumscribed, Polygala includes annual and perennial plants, shrubs, vines, and trees. The roots often have a scent reminiscent of wintergreen. The leaf blades are generally undivided and smooth-edged, and are alternately arranged in most species. The inflorescence is a raceme or spikelike array of several flowers; the occasional species bears solitary flowers. The flower is bilateral in shape, with two large petal-like sepals on the sides, often called the "wings", and three smaller sepals behind. There are three petals in shades of reddish purple, yellow or white, which are joined at the bases. The lower of the three is the keel petal, which is "boat-shaped, cucullate [hood-like], or helmet-shaped". The keel petal may have a beak or a fringe on the tip. Stamens and style are within the curve of the keel petal. The fruit is a capsule, sometimes winged. It contains two seeds, which are usually black, hairy and tipped with a large white aril. No members of this genus are known to form nitrogen-fixing nodules.

== Taxonomy ==
The genus Polygala was first described by Carl Linnaeus in 1754. Phylogenetic studies showed that, as traditionally circumscribed, the genus was not monophyletic. It had become a "wastebasket taxon"; almost all species with a flower apparently similar to those of the Papilionoideae – two petaloid lateral sepals forming 'wings', two petals forming a 'standard', and one petal forming a 'keel', plus a bilocular fruit capsule – were placed in Polygala, while species with more obviously specialized features, particularly those of the fruit, were placed in other genera. In 2011, John Richard Abbott separated some more sharply defined genera from Polygala.

=== Species ===
Partly because of differing circumscriptions, the reported number of valid species in the genus varies from about 350 to 500 to 725 or 730. The Americas have the most species, especially South America, with Africa second in diversity and Asia third. As of July 2024, Plants of the World Online accepted about 420 species in the genus Polygala. These include:

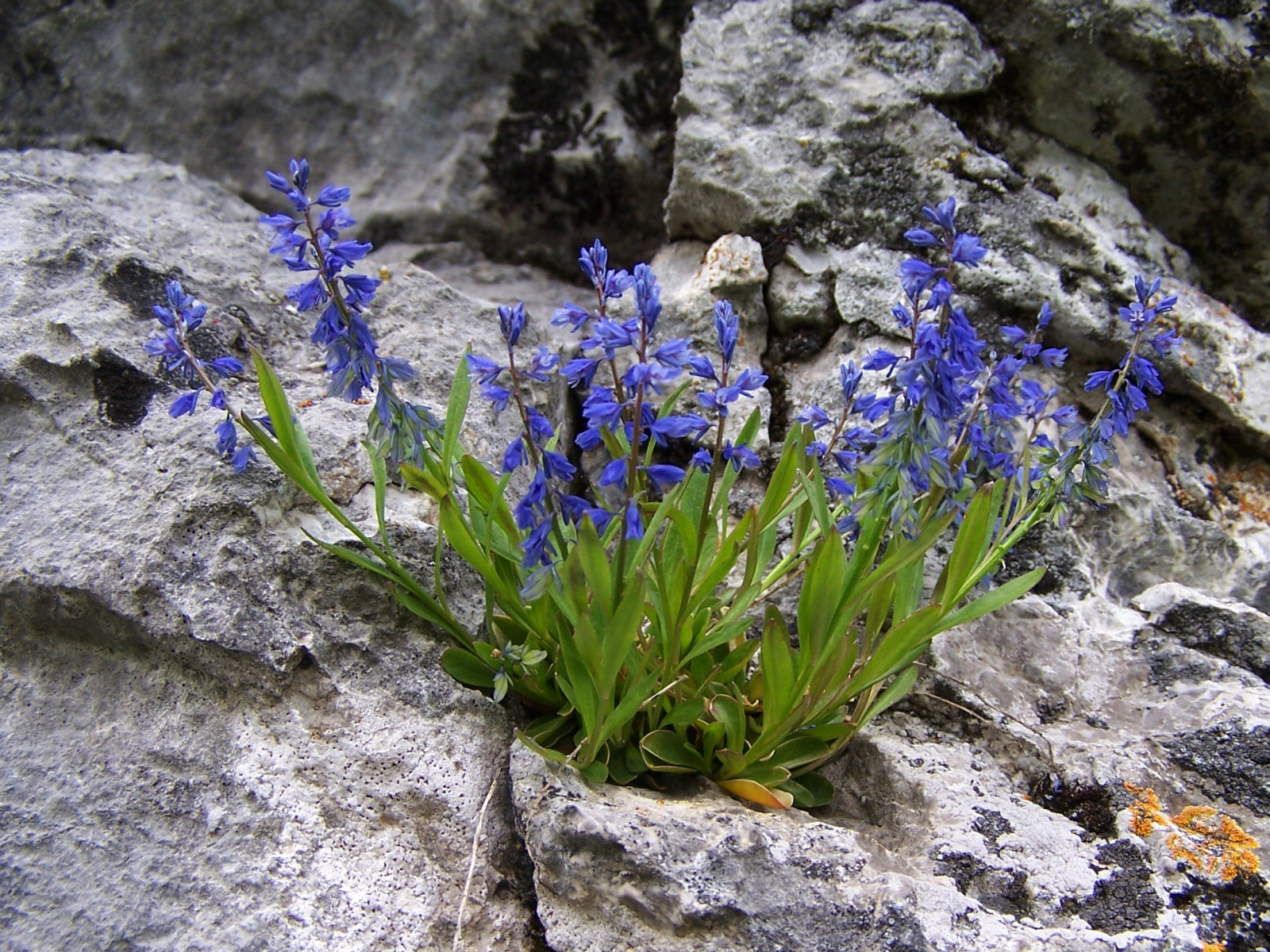
Polygala amara

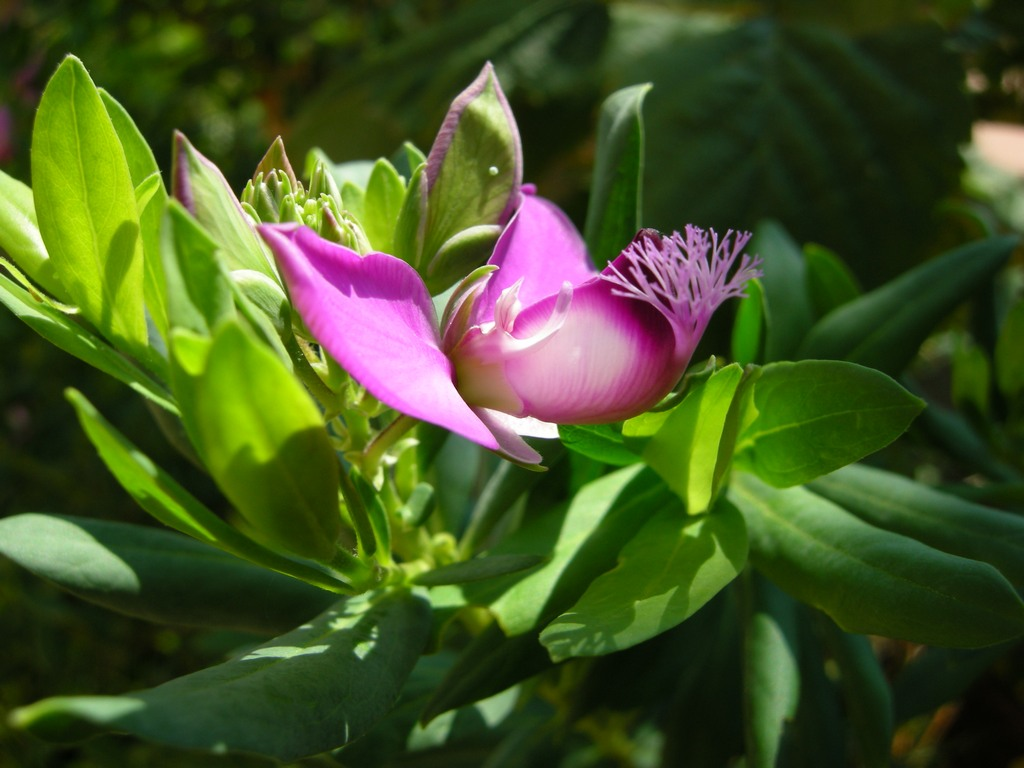
Polygala myrtifolia

- Polygala alpestris – alpine milkwort
- Polygala amara – bitter milkwort
- Polygala amarella – dwarf milkwort
- Polygala calcarea – chalk milkwort
- Polygala helenae
- Polygala kuriensis
- Polygala myrtifolia – butterfly-bush, parrotbush, myrtle-leaf milkwort, cascade curse
- Polygala serpyllifolia – thyme-leaved milkwort
- Polygala sinisica
- Polygala tenuifolia – Chinese senega-root
- Polygala vulgaris – common milkwort
- Polygala tamdaoensis

==== Former species ====
- Polygala acanthoclada = Rhinotropis acanthoclada
- Polygala africana = Senega africana
- Polygala alba = Senega alba
- Polygala ambigua Nutt. = Senega ambigua
- Polygala ambigua Torr. & A.Gray = Senega nuttallii
- Polygala boykinii = Senega boykinii
- Polygala californica = Rhinotropis californica
- Polygala chamaebuxus = Chamaebuxus alpestris
- Polygala cornuta = Rhinotropis cornuta
- Polygala cruciata = Senega cruciata
- Polygala curtissii = Senega curtissii
- Polygala heterorhyncha = Rhinotropis heterorhyncha
- Polygala gnidioides = Senega gnidioides
- Polygala incarnata Aubl. = Senega adenophora
- Polygala incarnata L. = Senega incarnata
- Polygala intermontana = Rhinotropis intermontana
- Polygala lewtonii = Senega lewtonii
- Polygala lutea = Senega lutea
- Polygala macradenia = Hebecarpa macradenia
- Polygala nana = Senega nana
- Polygala paucifolia = Chamaebuxus paucifolia
- Polygala poaya = Senega poaya
- Polygala polygama = Senega polygama
- Polygala pterolopha = Monrosia pterolopha
- Polygala quitensis = Senega quitensis
- Polygala rectipilis = Hebecarpa rectipilis
- Polygala sanguinea L. = Senega sanguinea
- Polygala sanguinea Nutt. = Senega nuttallii
- Polygala senega = Senega officinalis
- Polygala smallii = Senega smallii
- Polygala stricta Gay = Senega subandina
- Polygala subspinosa = Rhinotropis subspinosa

=== Hybrid ===
Polygala × dalmaisiana (of garden origin)

== Ecology ==
Polygala species are used as food plants by the larvae of some Lepidoptera species including large grizzled skipper.

== Cultivation ==
Some species are valued in cultivation. Polygala × dalmaisiana, an evergreen shrub, has gained the Royal Horticultural Society's Award of Garden Merit.
