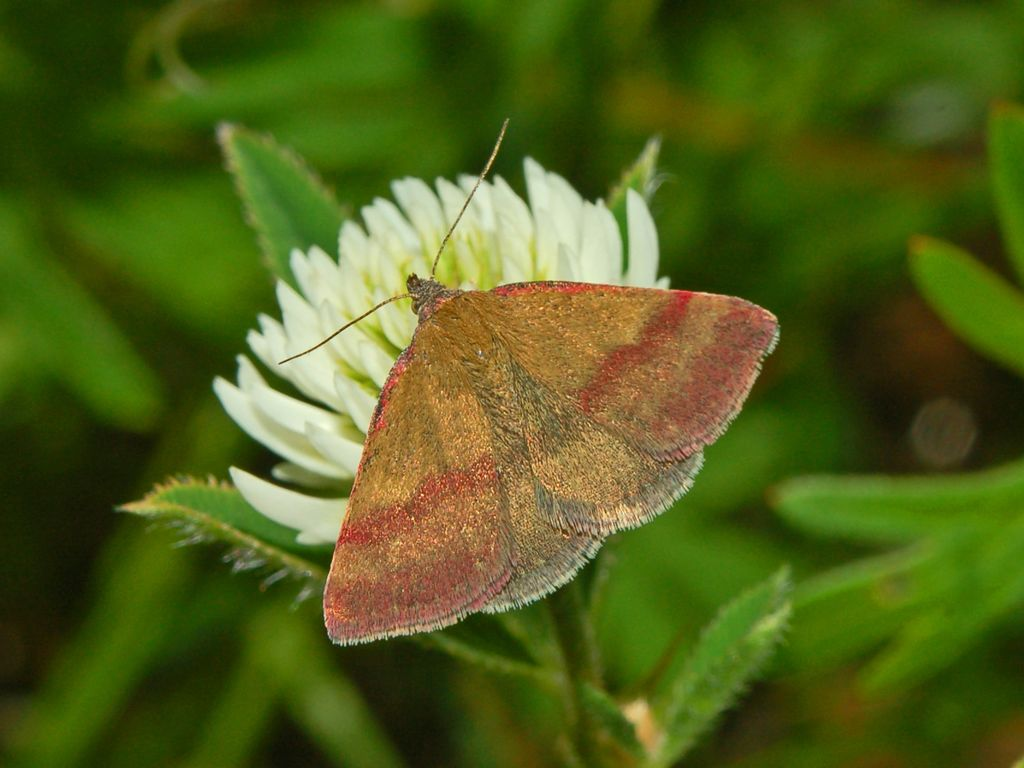

Scientific classification
- Domain: Eukaryota
- Kingdom: Animalia
- Phylum: Arthropoda
- Class: Insecta
- Order: Lepidoptera
- Superfamily: Noctuoidea
- Family: Erebidae
- Genus: Phytometra
- Species: P. viridaria

Binomial name
- Phytometra viridaria (Clerck, 1759)

= Phytometra viridaria =

Small purple-barred

Species of moth

Phytometra viridaria, the small purple-barred, is a moth of the family Erebidae. The species was first described by Carl Alexander Clerck in 1759. It is found in central and southern Europe, Mauritania, Morocco, Algeria, Tunisia, Armenia, Iraq, Iran, Afghanistan, Pakistan, and further east across the Palearctic to southern Siberia.

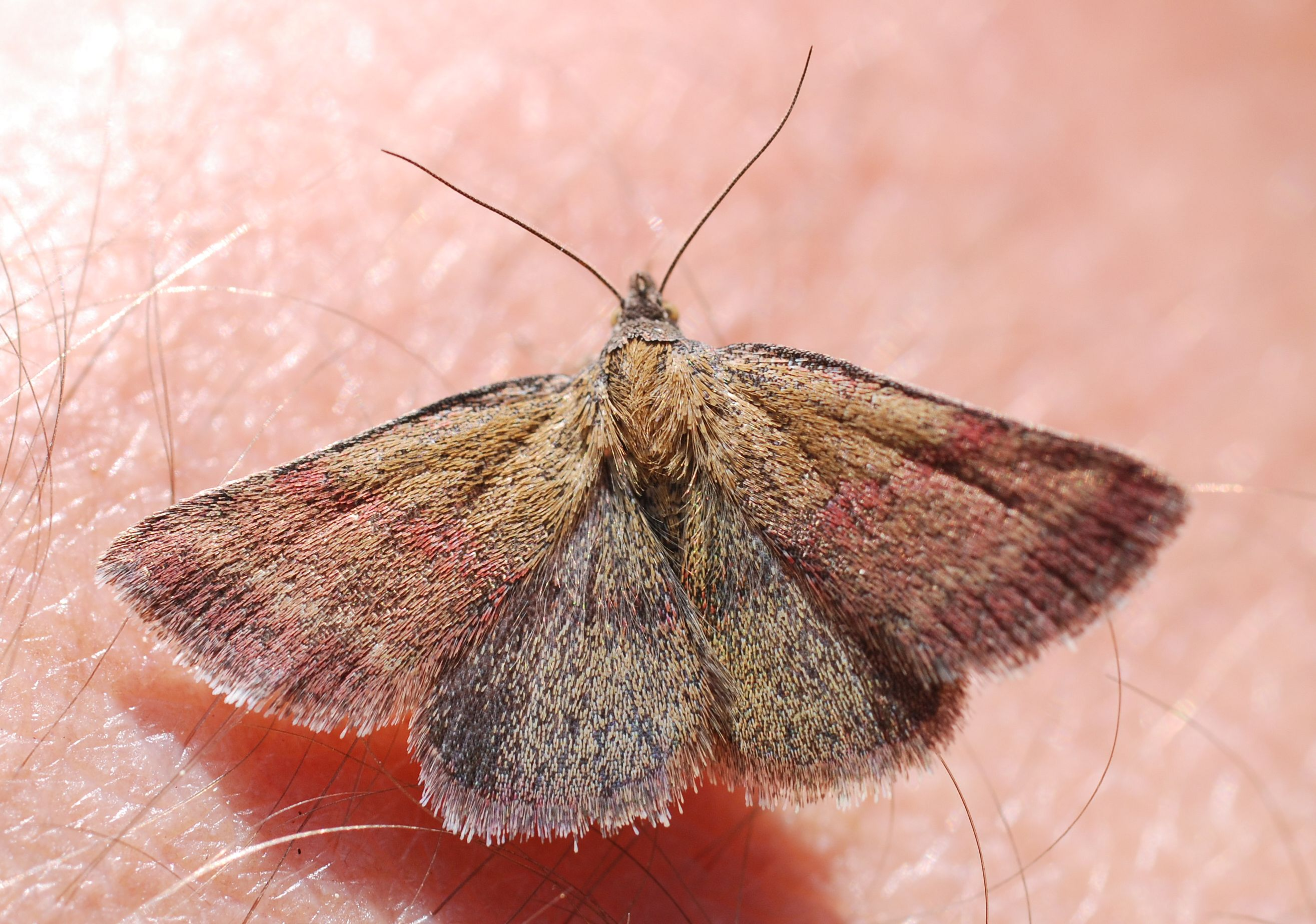
Dorsal view

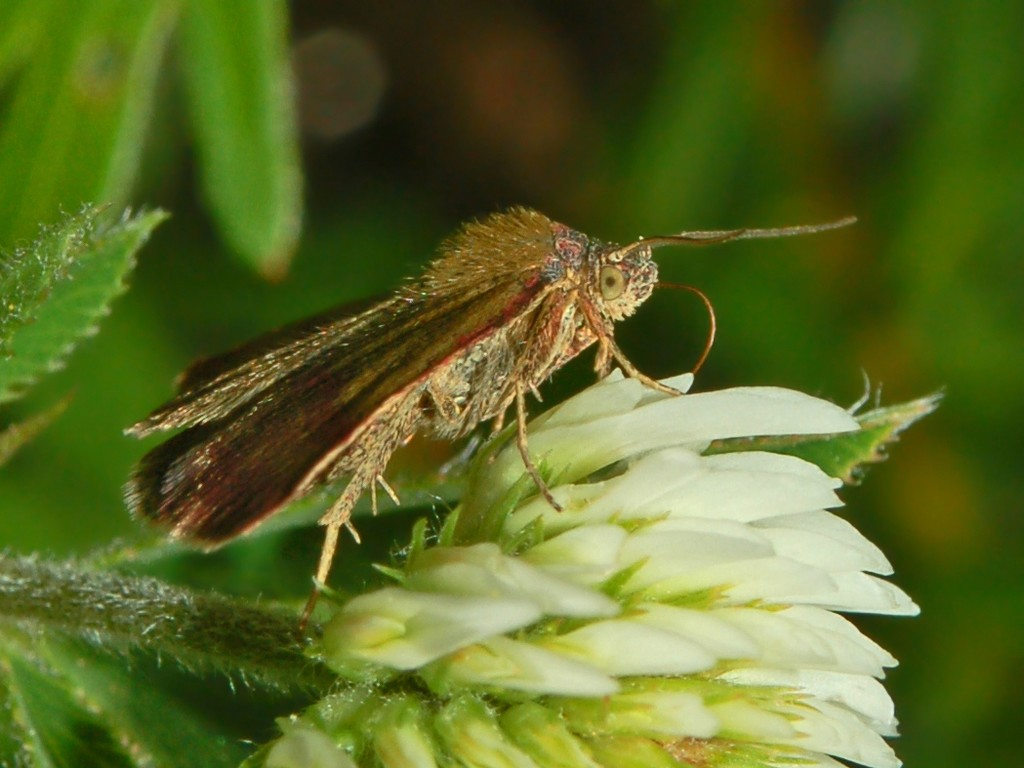
Lateral view

== Technical description and variation ==
The wingspan is 19–20 mm. The length of the forewings is 9–11 mm. Forewing olive brownish; the costa at base, and an outer and terminal fascia deep rosy purple; the outer band varying in width; a pale line of ground colour between them; hindwing olive with a median and terminal darker band more or less tinged with purple; in ab. fusca Tutt the purple tints are replaced by dark brown; —ab. aenea Hbn. the ground colour is olive grey or fuscous instead of green; ab. suffusa Tutt is a rare form, blackish fuscous with a still darker terminal border.

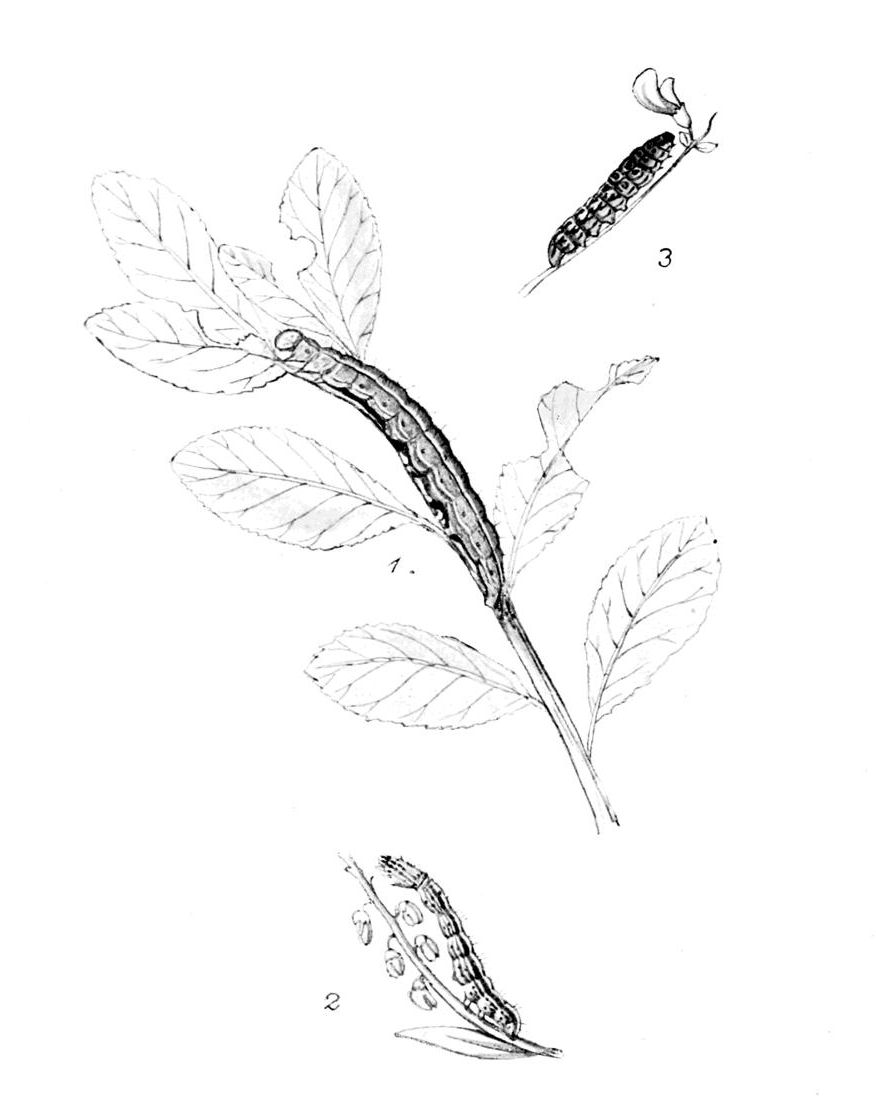
Larva (figure2)

== Biology ==
The moth flies from April to August depending on the location.

Larva green with darker pale-edged dorsal line; the other lines pale, the subspiracular becoming white on anal segments.

The larvae feed on Polygala vulgaris, Polygala serpyllifolia and Pedicularis sylvatica.
