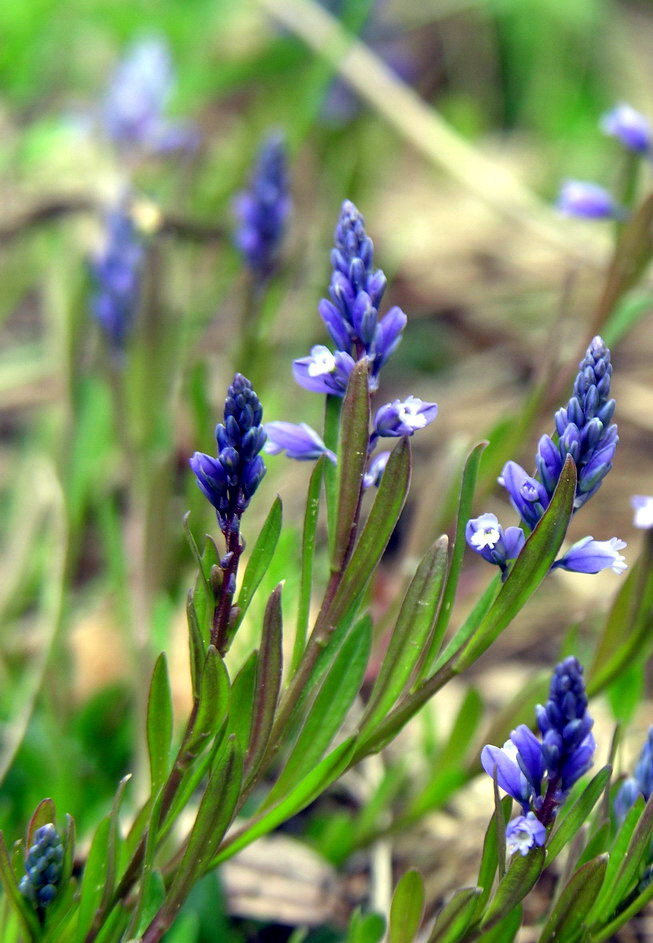

Scientific classification
- Kingdom: Plantae
- Clade: Tracheophytes
- Clade: Angiosperms
- Clade: Eudicots
- Clade: Rosids
- Order: Fabales
- Family: Polygalaceae
- Genus: Polygala
- Species: P. amarella

Binomial name
- Polygala amarella Crantz

= Polygala amarella =

Dwarf milkwort

Species of flowering plant

Polygala amarella (or P. amara), commonly known as dwarf milkwort or Kentish milkwort, is a plant of the family Polygalaceae. A European native, it grows on chalky grass land and limestone mountain pastures.

== Description ==
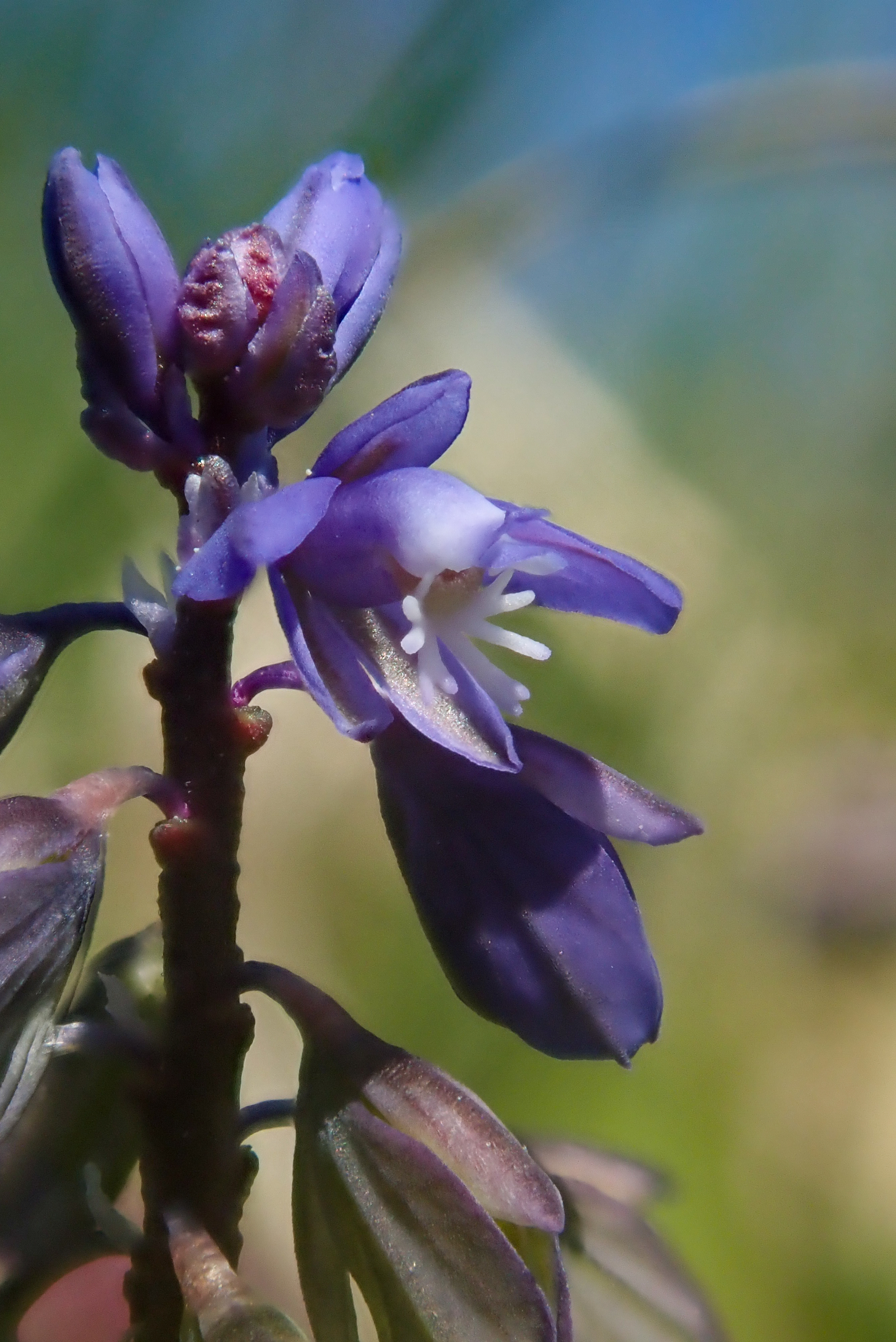
Close-up of the flower

Dwarf milkwort is a tiny, erect perennial that grows up to 20 cm but is often just 1.5 - 5 cm tall, with a basal rosette of shiny, obovate leaves. Leaves on the unbranched stem are alternate and narrowly lanceolate. The stem is slightly woody at the base. It has typically 7-20 zygomorphic flowers, arranged in a raceme, that are variable in colour from pale mauve to white, with hints of green in populations in Kent. The flowers are 2.5-5 mm long and have three tiny outer sepals, two large, coloured inner sepals and three small, white true petals that are fused.

== Identification ==
This species is very similar to chalk milkwort but can easily be separated from it by the rosette leaves being basal in dwarf milkwort, but slightly raised on the stem in chalk milkwort. Also, dwarf milkwort has a bitter taste (not so in chalk milkwort). In dwarf milkwort the inner sepals are longer than the petals.

== Distribution ==
Widespread throughout Europe, especially in the Alps, but currently only found in Kent and Yorkshire in the UK, where it is found at the periphery of its range. Mostly found on chalky grasslands of Kent on the North Downs, and on limestone outcrops in the Yorkshire Dales.

== Ecology ==
The Ellenberg values: L=9, F=6, R=9, N=1, S=0 which means that the plant grows in full light, moist, basic, infertile soils with no salinity. It is a short lived polycarpic perennial. Reproduction is solely by seeds, which have a small oily appendage (known as the elaiosome), which aids dispersal by ants. It is believed the Kent population is shorter-lived than the Northern British population. The seeds persist in the soil for less than a year.

== Uses ==
Dwarf milkwort has traditionally been used in herbal medicine.

== In media ==
In 2009 it featured on a first class Royal Mail stamp in the series "Endangered Plants".
