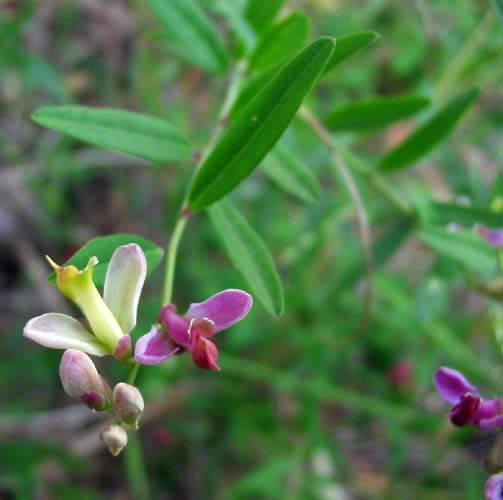
- Rhinotropis cornuta

Scientific classification
- Kingdom: Plantae
- Clade: Tracheophytes
- Clade: Angiosperms
- Clade: Eudicots
- Clade: Rosids
- Order: Fabales
- Family: Polygalaceae
- Genus: Rhinotropis (S.F.Blake) J.R.Abbott

Species
- See text.

= Rhinotropis =

Genus of flowering plants

Rhinotropis is a small genus in the family Polygalaceae. It was separated as a genus from Polygala by J. Richard Abbott in 2011. It is native to the south and west of the United States (Arizona, California, Colorado, Nevada, New Mexico, Texas and Utah) and to Mexico.

== Species ==
As of April 2020, Plants of the World Online accepted the following species:

- Rhinotropis acanthoclada (A.Gray) J.R.Abbott
- Rhinotropis californica (Nutt.) J.R.Abbott
- Rhinotropis cornuta (Kellogg) J.R.Abbott
- Rhinotropis desertorum (Brandegee) J.R.Abbott
- Rhinotropis heterorhyncha (Barneby) J.R.Abbott
- Rhinotropis intermontana (T.Wendt) J.R.Abbott
- Rhinotropis lindheimeri (A.Gray) J.R.Abbott
- Rhinotropis madrensis (T.Wendt) J.R.Abbott
- Rhinotropis maravillasensis (Correll) J.R.Abbott
- Rhinotropis minutifolia (Rose) J.R.Abbott
- Rhinotropis nitida (Brandegee) J.R.Abbott
- Rhinotropis nudata (Brandegee) J.R.Abbott
- Rhinotropis parryi (A.W.Benn.) J.R.Abbott
- Rhinotropis purpusii (Brandegee) J.R.Abbott
- Rhinotropis rimulicola (Steyerm.) J.R.Abbott
- Rhinotropis rusbyi (Greene) J.R.Abbott
- Rhinotropis subspinosa (S.Watson) J.R.Abbott
