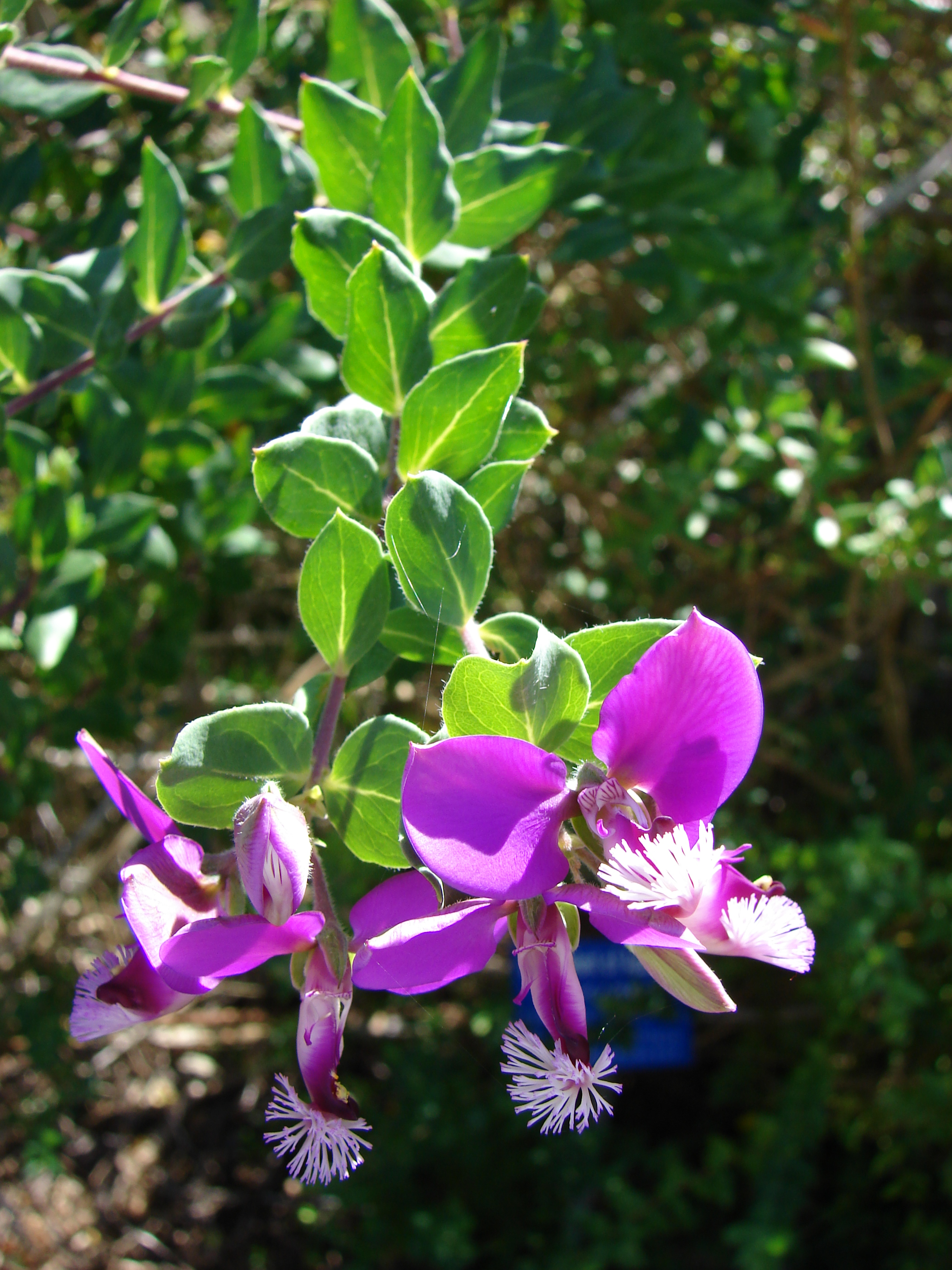

Scientific classification
- Kingdom: Plantae
- Clade: Tracheophytes
- Clade: Angiosperms
- Clade: Eudicots
- Clade: Rosids
- Order: Fabales
- Family: Polygalaceae
- Genus: Polygala
- Species: P. × dalmaisiana

Binomial name
- Polygala × dalmaisiana Neumann

= Polygala × dalmaisiana =

Species of shrub

Polygala × dalmaisiana (P. fruticosa × P. myrtifolia), the sweet pea shrub, is an ornamental plant of genus Polygala in the family Polygalaceae. This plant is attractive to hummingbirds, and it is often propagated by cuttings.

Growing to 1.5 m (4.9 ft), it is a tender evergreen shrub with pea-like purple flowers in late summer. As it does not tolerate temperatures below 5 °C (41 °F), in temperate zones it must be grown under glass. However it may be placed outside in a sheltered spot during the summer months. It is a recipient of the Royal Horticultural Society's Award of Garden Merit.
