= Shrubby milkwort =

Shrubby milkwort is a common name for several species of plants and may refer to:

- Chamaebuxus alpestris, native to west-central and southern Europe
- Rhinotropis lindheimeri, native to the southwestern United States and northern Mexico
