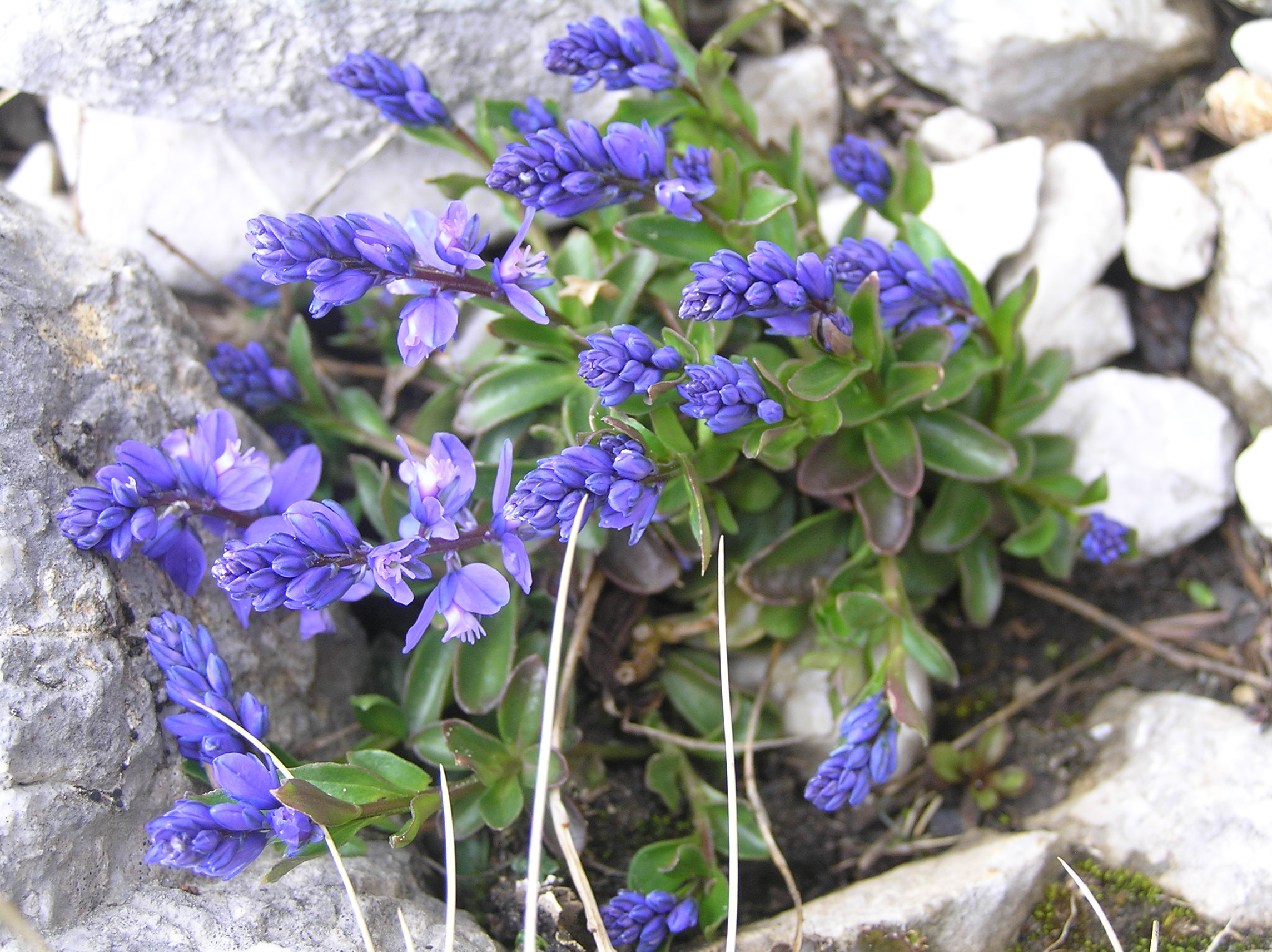

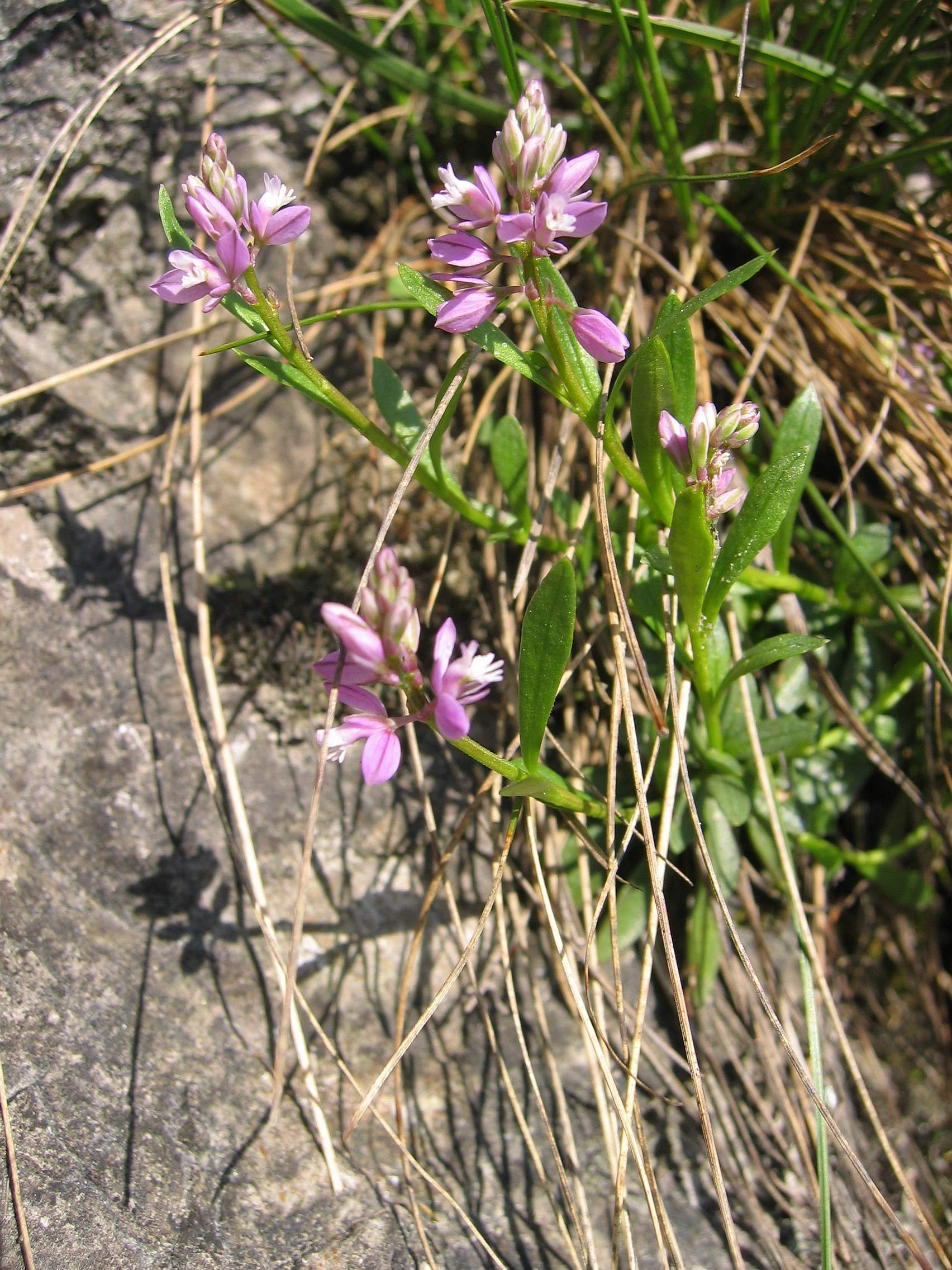
- Polygala amara subsp. brachyptera

Scientific classification
- Kingdom: Plantae
- Clade: Tracheophytes
- Clade: Angiosperms
- Clade: Eudicots
- Clade: Rosids
- Order: Fabales
- Family: Polygalaceae
- Genus: Polygala
- Species: P. amara

Binomial name
- Polygala amara L.

= Polygala amara =

Species of flowering plant

Polygala amara is a species of flowering plant in the milkwort family (Polygalaceae). It was described in 1769 and is found in Germany, Poland, Slovakia, the Czech Republic, Hungary, Slovenia, Croatia, Bosnia, Serbia, and Montenegro.
