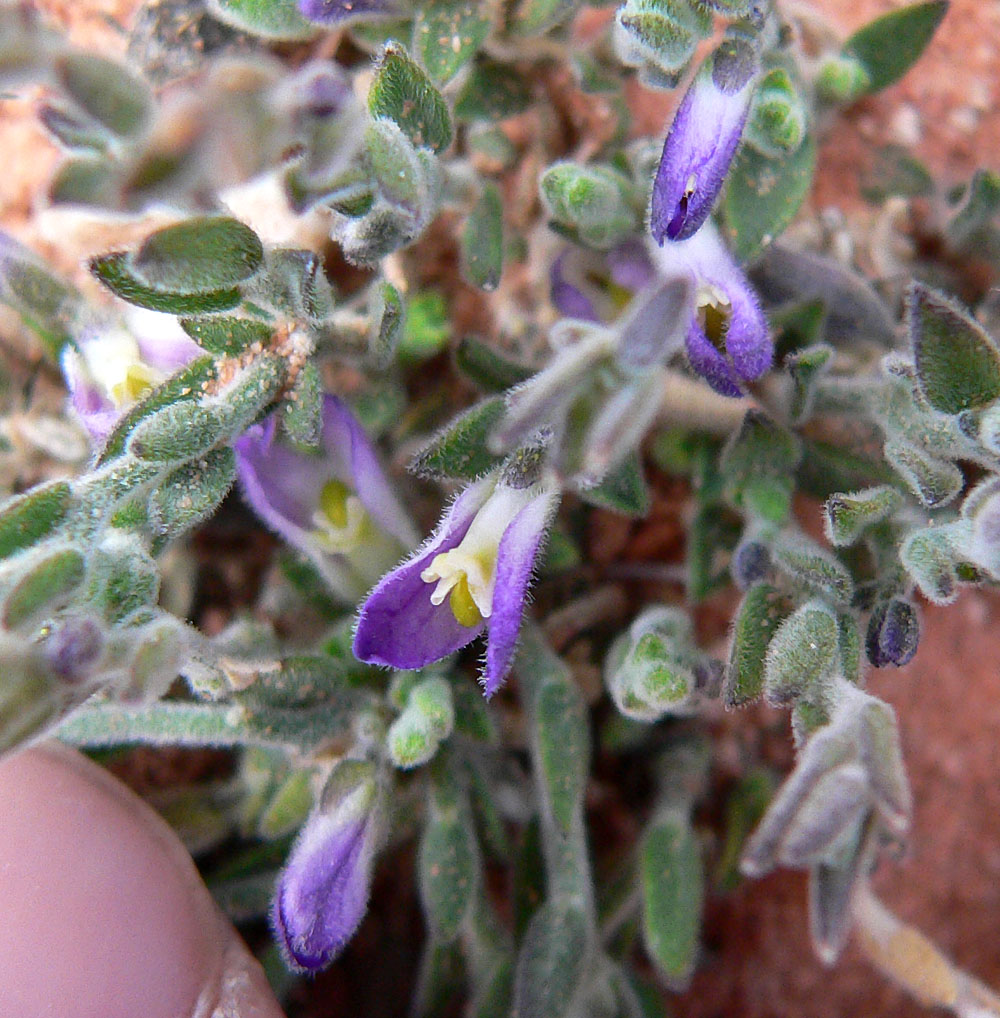
- Hebecarpa macradenia

Scientific classification
- Kingdom: Plantae
- Clade: Tracheophytes
- Clade: Angiosperms
- Clade: Eudicots
- Clade: Rosids
- Order: Fabales
- Family: Polygalaceae
- Genus: Hebecarpa (Chodat) J.R.Abbott

Species
- See text.

= Hebecarpa =

Genus of flowering plants

Hebecarpa is a genus of flowering plants belonging to the family Polygalaceae. Species are found from the southern United States (Arizona, Texas and New Mexico) through Mexico and Central America to western South America.

== Species ==
As of April 2020, Plants of the World Online accepted the following species:

- Hebecarpa americana (Mill.) J.R.I.Wood & S.Beck
- Hebecarpa barbeyana (Chodat) J.R.Abbott
- Hebecarpa buxifolia (Kunth) J.R.Abbott & J.F.B.Pastore
- Hebecarpa caracasana (Kunth) J.R.Abbott & J.F.B.Pastore
- Hebecarpa costaricensis (Chodat) J.R.Abbott & J.F.B.Pastore
- Hebecarpa hebantha (Benth.) J.R.Abbott & J.F.B.Pastore
- Hebecarpa macradenia (A.Gray) J.R.Abbott
- Hebecarpa myrtilloides (Willd.) J.R.Abbott & J.F.B.Pastore
- Hebecarpa obscura (Benth.) J.R.Abbott
- Hebecarpa ovatifolia (A.Gray) J.R.Abbott
- Hebecarpa palmeri (S.Watson) J.R.Abbott
- Hebecarpa platycarpa (Benth.) J.R.Abbott & J.F.B.Pastore
- Hebecarpa punctata (Humb. ex Schult.) J.R.Abbott & J.F.B.Pastore
- Hebecarpa rectipilis (S.F.Blake) J.R.Abbott
- Hebecarpa rivinifolia (Kunth) J.R.Abbott & J.F.B.Pastore
- Hebecarpa robinsonii (S.F.Blake) J.R.Abbott & J.F.B.Pastore
- Hebecarpa rossychaveziae J.R.I.Wood & S.Beck
- Hebecarpa tehuacana (Brandegee) J.R.Abbott & J.F.B.Pastore
- Hebecarpa velutina (C.Presl) J.R.Abbott & J.F.B.Pastore
