= Polygala helenae =

Conservation status
- Critically Endangered (IUCN 3.1)

Scientific classification
- Kingdom: Plantae
- Clade: Tracheophytes
- Clade: Angiosperms
- Clade: Eudicots
- Clade: Rosids
- Order: Fabales
- Family: Polygalaceae
- Genus: Polygala
- Species: P. helenae

Binomial name
- Polygala helenae Greuter

Species of shrub

Polygala helenae, commonly known as the milkwort of Kythira, is a species of flowering plant in the family Polygalaceae. It is endemic to Greece, specifically the island of Kythira. Its natural habitat is Mediterranean-type shrubby vegetation, and it is threatened by habitat loss. The species is classified as endangered on the IUCN Red List.

== Description ==
Polygala helenae is a perennial herb with slender branches that often grow through and extend beyond the protective cover of spiny shrubs in its habitat. The plant is noted for being rather inconspicuous and difficult to spot in the wild, which contributes to the challenges in studying and monitoring it. It bears resemblance to related Balkan endemic species such as Polygala venulosa and P. supina.

== Distribution and habitat ==
This species is strictly endemic to Kythira, a small Greek island of 284 km^{2} situated in the Ionian Sea, opposite the eastern tip of the Peloponnese peninsula (Cape Maleas). Originally documented near Kalamos village, additional populations have since been discovered at other sites on the island, including Myrtidia and Vroulea.

Polygala helenae has a narrow ecological niche, growing primarily in phrygana vegetation—a habitat type characterised by spiny or aromatic dwarf shrubs that develop on dry, lowland soils. The plant typically grows in association with spiny broom (Genista acanthoclada) and thorny burnet (Sarcopoterium spinosum). Other plants found in its habitat include Coridothymus capitatus, Calicotome villosa, Erica species, Cistus species, and low shrubs of Pistacia lentiscus. The Greek endemic crimson tulip, Tulipa goulimyi, may also be found in the same areas.

Rather than growing in open areas, P. helenae is typically found growing between or under the protective cover of other shrubs, which partly explains why it is easily overlooked.

== Conservation status ==
Polygala helenae is classified as Endangered under IUCN Red List criteria B1ab(iii)+2ab(iii). The species was previously assessed as Vulnerable in the first edition of the Red Data Book of Rare and Threatened Plants of Greece, but was later reclassified as Critically Endangered in 2005. With the discovery of additional sites expanding its known range, the threat level was adjusted to Endangered.

The plant has a very restricted range, with an area of occupancy of approximately 12 km^{2} across three known locations. Population surveys conducted in 2023 documented between 116 and 200 individuals in the Myrtidia area, more than 200 individuals in the Kalamos area, and a declining population of fewer than 50 individuals in the Vroulea area (down from 86 counted in 2022).

=== Threats ===
Several factors threaten the continued survival of P. helenae. Potential agricultural expansion represents a significant concern; while its habitat is no longer used for farming, there is a risk that the land could be reclaimed for agricultural purposes, which would likely eliminate the species from affected areas. Increased tourism development on Kythira also poses a considerable threat to the plant's habitat through land-use changes and disturbance.

Infrastructure development further endangers the species, particularly in the Vroulea area where the plant grows on an unpaved road that is rumoured to be widened and paved with cement in the future. Wildfire risk constitutes another major threat; some locations where it grows have not experienced wildfires for over a century, potentially increasing the risk of severe fires. Researchers have also noted significant habitat degradation in certain areas, with dried vegetation and weakened shoots of Polygala struggling to survive in increasingly adverse conditions.

=== Conservation efforts ===
Polygala helenae is included in Greek national legislation (Presidential Decree 67/1981), and is listed among the Top 50 Mediterranean island plants on the brink of extinction. Despite this formal recognition, few concrete conservation measures have been implemented to date. Initial ex-situ conservation attempts, including seed cultivation and transplantation to the Botanic Garden of the University of Patras, have been unsuccessful. More recently, conservation scientists collected 600 mature and immature seeds for scientific research and long-term storage in seed banks, including the National and Kapodistrian University of Athens and the Millennium Seed Bank at Kew Gardens.

Current conservation recommendations focus on protection and management of areas where the species occurs, continued population monitoring, further research on the plant's ecology and threats, habitat restoration, education of landowners, raising public awareness about the species' significance, and development of a comprehensive recovery plan. Experts agree that on-site protection represents the most promising approach for ensuring the species' survival. One hopeful sign for the species' persistence is the observation of seed dispersal by ants, a process known as myrmecochory, facilitated by the well-developed seed elaiosomes characteristic of Polygala species.

== Taxonomy ==
Polygala helenae was formally described as a new species in 1967 by the Swiss botanist Werner Greuter.
