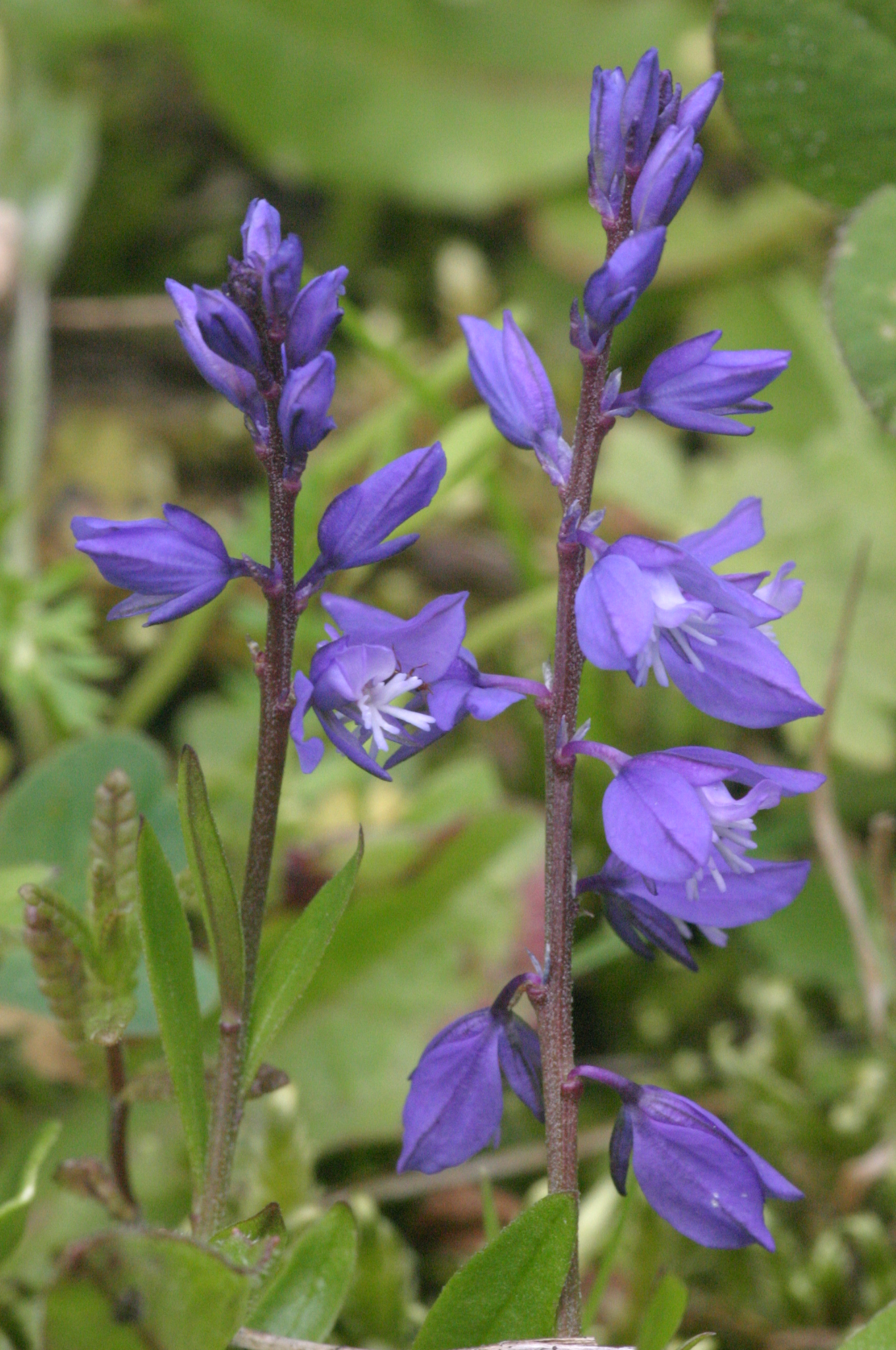

Scientific classification
- Kingdom: Plantae
- Clade: Tracheophytes
- Clade: Angiosperms
- Clade: Eudicots
- Clade: Rosids
- Order: Fabales
- Family: Polygalaceae
- Genus: Polygala
- Species: P. alpestris

Binomial name
- Polygala alpestris Rchb

= Polygala alpestris =

Species of flowering plant

Polygala alpestris is a species of flowering plant in the milkwort family (Polygalaceae). It was described in 1823 and is found in Austria, France, Germany, Italy, Spain, Georgia, Turkey and Switzerland.
