= Tenuifolin =

Bioactive terpenoids

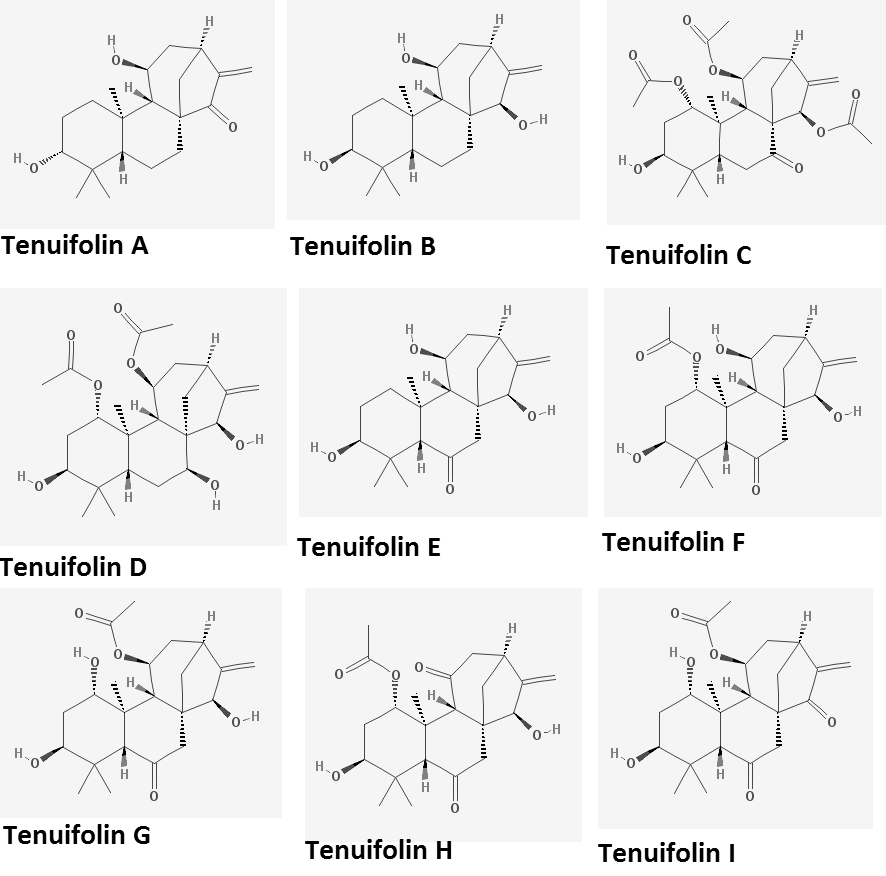
Tenuifolin A-I

Tenuifolins are bio-active terpenoids. Tenuifolins inhibit beta-amyloid synthesis in vitro. Tenuifolins have nootropic activity in vivo via acetylcholinesterase inhibition and increased norepinephrine and dopamine production.

== See also ==
- Polygala tenuifolia
