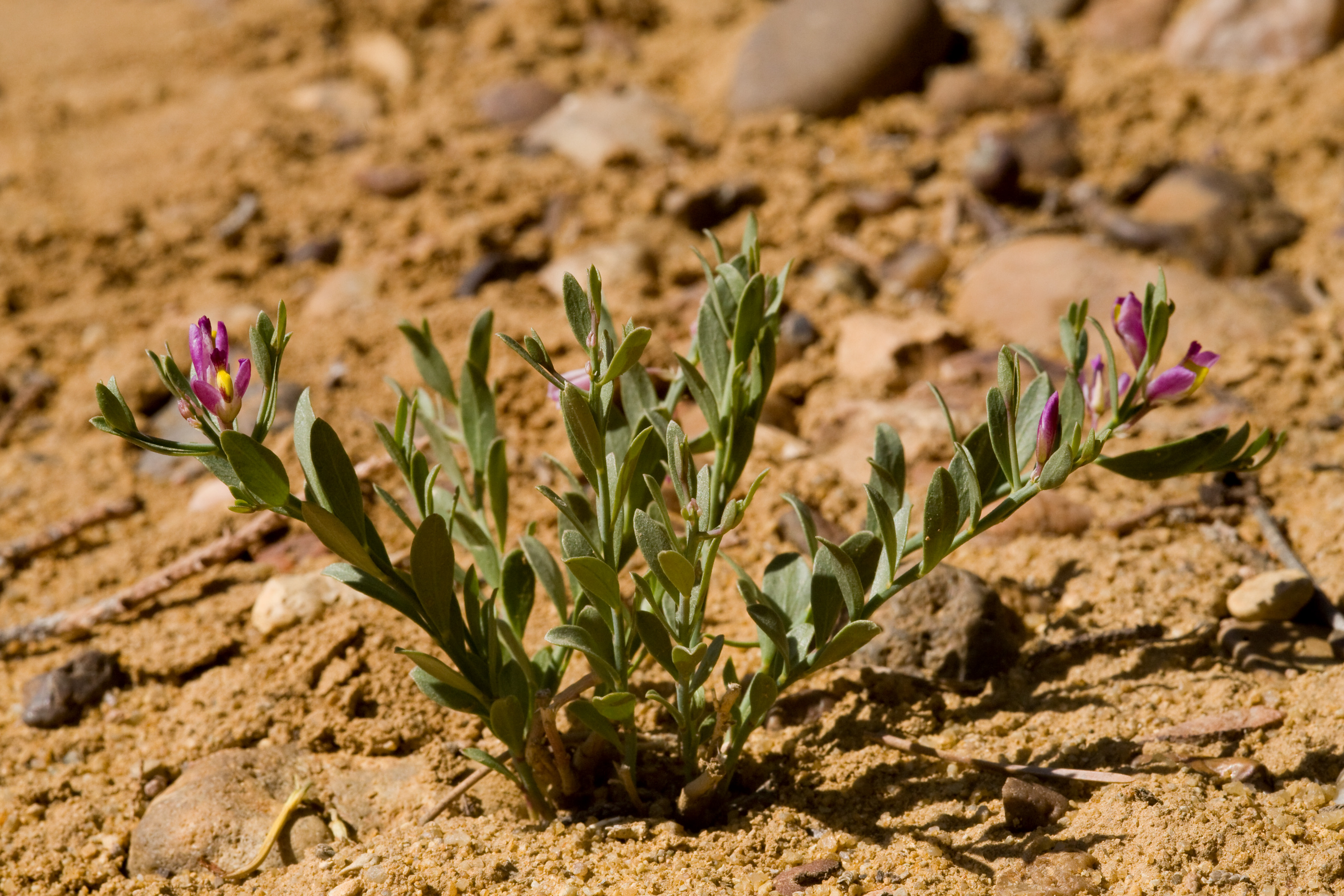
- Northeastern outskirts of Farmington, New Mexico

Conservation status
- Apparently Secure (NatureServe)

Scientific classification
- Kingdom: Plantae
- Clade: Embryophytes
- Clade: Tracheophytes
- Clade: Angiosperms
- Clade: Eudicots
- Clade: Rosids
- Order: Fabales
- Family: Polygalaceae
- Genus: Rhinotropis
- Species: R. subspinosa

Binomial name
- Rhinotropis subspinosa (S.Watson) J.R.Abbott

Synonyms
- Polygala lasseniana A.Heller; Polygala subspinosa S.Watson

= Rhinotropis subspinosa =

Plant species in the milkwort family

Rhinotropis subspinosa is a species of flowering plant in the milkwort family known by the common name spiny milkwort. It is native to the southwestern United States, where it grows in desert and plateau habitat. It is a perennial herb or small shrub growing in a clump no more than 25 centimeters tall. The stems have woody bases and green, thorn-tipped branches. The leaves are up to 3 centimeters in length and generally oval in shape. The flowers have winglike pairs of bright pink sepals and the keeled central petal is tipped with a yellowish beak, sometimes fringed at the tip.

== Taxonomy ==
In 1873 the botanist Sereno Watson scientifically described a new species in the Polygala genus which he named Polygala subspinosa. In 2011 J. Richard Abbott moved it to Rhinotropis, giving the species its accepted name. Together with its genus it is classified in the Polygalaceae family. It has an additional heterotypic synonym, Polygala lasseniana, published by Amos Arthur Heller in 1940.
