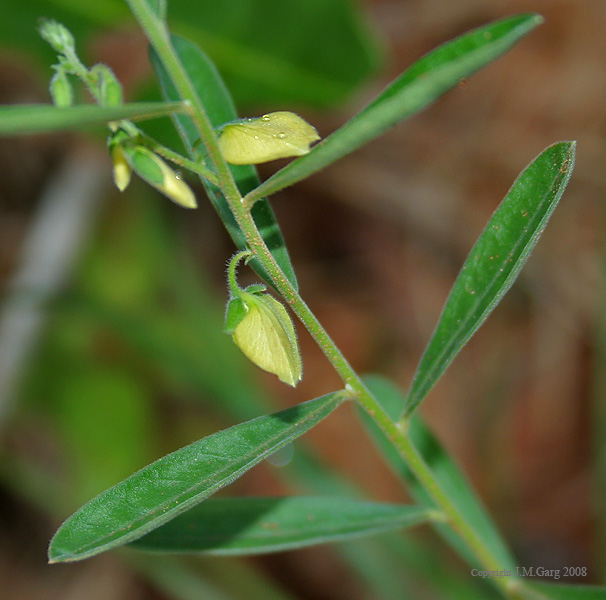

Scientific classification
- Kingdom: Plantae
- Clade: Embryophytes
- Clade: Tracheophytes
- Clade: Spermatophytes
- Clade: Angiosperms
- Clade: Eudicots
- Clade: Rosids
- Order: Fabales
- Family: Polygalaceae
- Genus: Polygala
- Species: P. tenuifolia

Binomial name
- Polygala tenuifolia Willd.

= Polygala tenuifolia =

Species of herb

Polygala tenuifolia (yuǎn zhì; Chinese: 远志) is an herb in the family Polygalaceae which is hardy to USDA Zone 6.

== Phytochemistry ==
P. tenuifolia contains tenuifolin, senegenin, and polygalacic acid.

== Medicinal uses ==
Yuan zhi is used primarily as an expectorant. It is one of the 50 fundamental herbs used in traditional Chinese medicine, where it is called yuǎn zhì (Chinese: 遠志) and believed to have neuropsychiatric effects. It has been studied as a potential drug source in depression and Alzheimer's. The quality of the herb varies widely, and as of 2020 there have been no toxicological studies or clinical trials. However, in a March, 2025, meta-analysis of 27 studies with 2,334 samples and 19 natural extract treatments, "[t]he most striking result was that the root extract of Polygala tenuifolia ... had the highest ranking for improving overall cognitive function".
