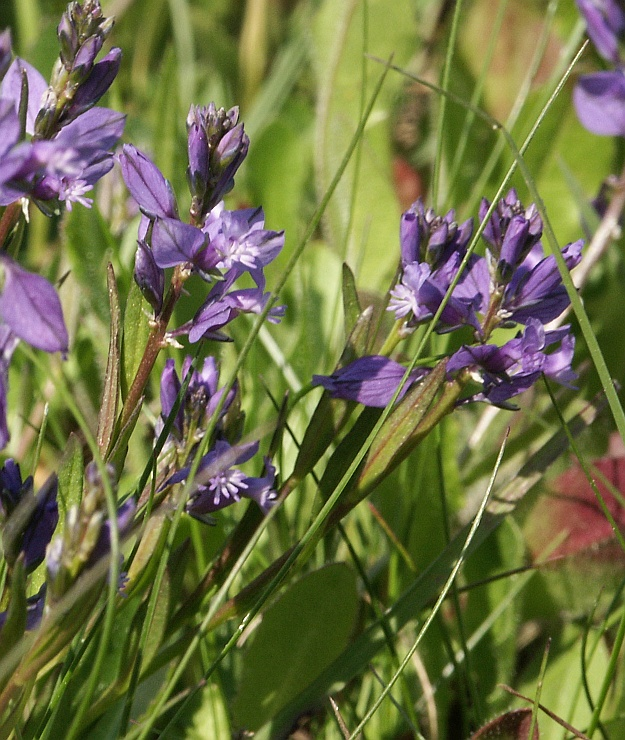

Scientific classification
- Kingdom: Plantae
- Clade: Embryophytes
- Clade: Tracheophytes
- Clade: Spermatophytes
- Clade: Angiosperms
- Clade: Eudicots
- Clade: Rosids
- Order: Fabales
- Family: Polygalaceae
- Genus: Polygala
- Species: P. vulgaris

Binomial name
- Polygala vulgaris L.

= Polygala vulgaris =

Species of flowering plant

Polygala vulgaris, known as the common milkwort, is a herbaceous perennial plant of the genus Polygala in the family Polygalaceae. It grows in Europe, Western Russia, and Turkey, and has been introduced to parts of the U.S.

== Description ==
The biological form of Polygala vulgaris is hemicryptophyte scapose, as its overwintering buds are situated just below the soil surface and the floral axis is more or less erect with a few leaves.

Polygala vulgaris reaches on average 7–35 centimetres (2.8–13.8 in) in height. The stems have many branches and are woody at the base. It has alternating pointed leaves, almost glabrous, 2 to 4 mm wide and 10 to 20 mm long. Basal leaves are spatulate, with rounded apex, while the upper leaves are lanceolate.

The flowers are gathered in long terminal inflorescences. The colour of the corolla varies between blue and violet, it can rarely occur in purple forms. The flower's outer three sepals are normally small, green and insignificant, whilst the inner two sepals are bigger. The inner sepals are usually shorter than the petals. The stalks of the eight stamens are joined to form a tube, and united with this tube, one on either side, are two tiny petals. On the lower side of the flower lies the third petal; it too, is joined to the stamen tube, but it is larger, and fringed. The flowering period extends from May through July.

Common milkwort is quite similar to the heath milkwort (Polygala serpyllifolia), but in this species the inner sepals are usually longer than the petals. The heath milkwort can be all the same colours except for white. These four possible colours account for the milkworts' Irish folk-name of 'four sisters'.

== Distribution ==
This species is native to Europe, including European Russia, and to Turkey. It is an introduced species in the US (Oregon and Michigan).

== Habitat ==
Common milkwort grows in meadows, slopes, edges of forests, heaths, sunny woods, dunes and grasslands. It is frequent in patches on calcerous grassland, from sea level up to 2200 meters.

== Culture ==
In Scandinavia, it was called Freya's hair, but after the introduction of Christianity, it was renamed after the Virgin Mary.

== Medicinal uses ==
According to Classical and Renaissance writers common milkwort was used medicinally as an infusion to increase the flow of a nursing mother's milk.

== Subspecies and varieties ==
Plants of the World Online recognises the following infraspecific names:

- Polygala vulgaris var. caliptera Legrand – France
- Polygala vulgaris subsp. collina (Rchb.) Borbás – Belgium, France, Germany, Great Britain
- Polygala vulgaris subsp. insubrica (Chodat) Arrigoni – Italy
- Polygala vulgaris subsp. oxyptera (Rchb.) Schübl. & G.Martens
- Polygala vulgaris subsp. valdarnensis (Fiori) Arrigoni - Italy
- Polygala vulgaris subsp. vulgaris

== Gallery ==
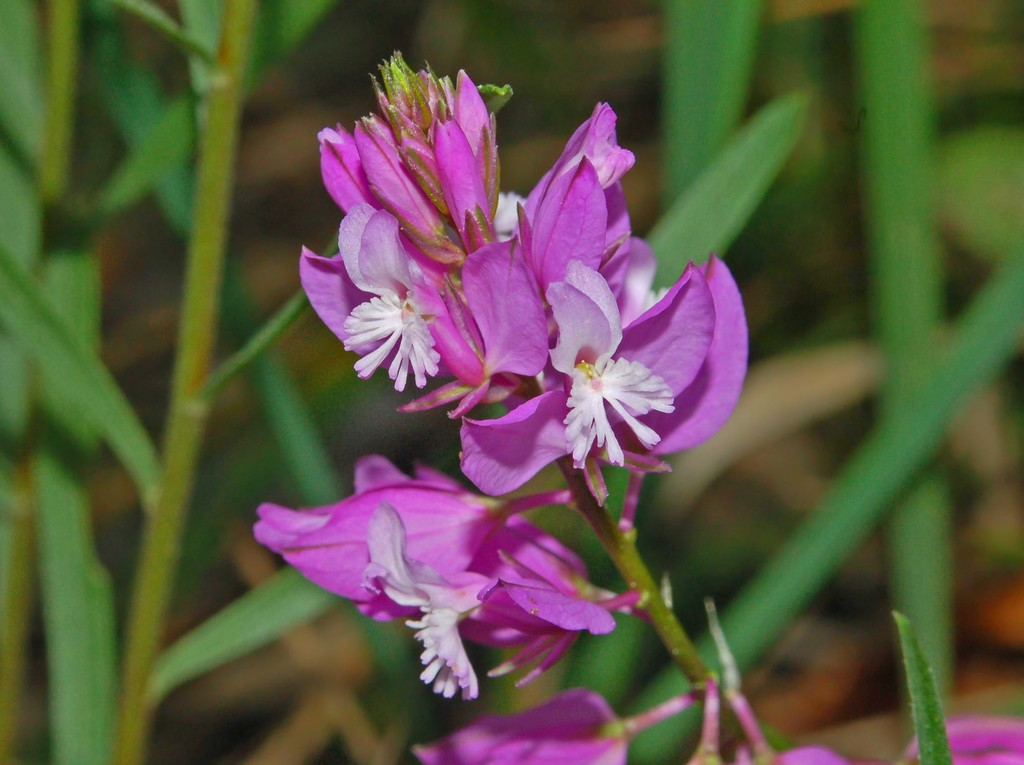
In Genoa

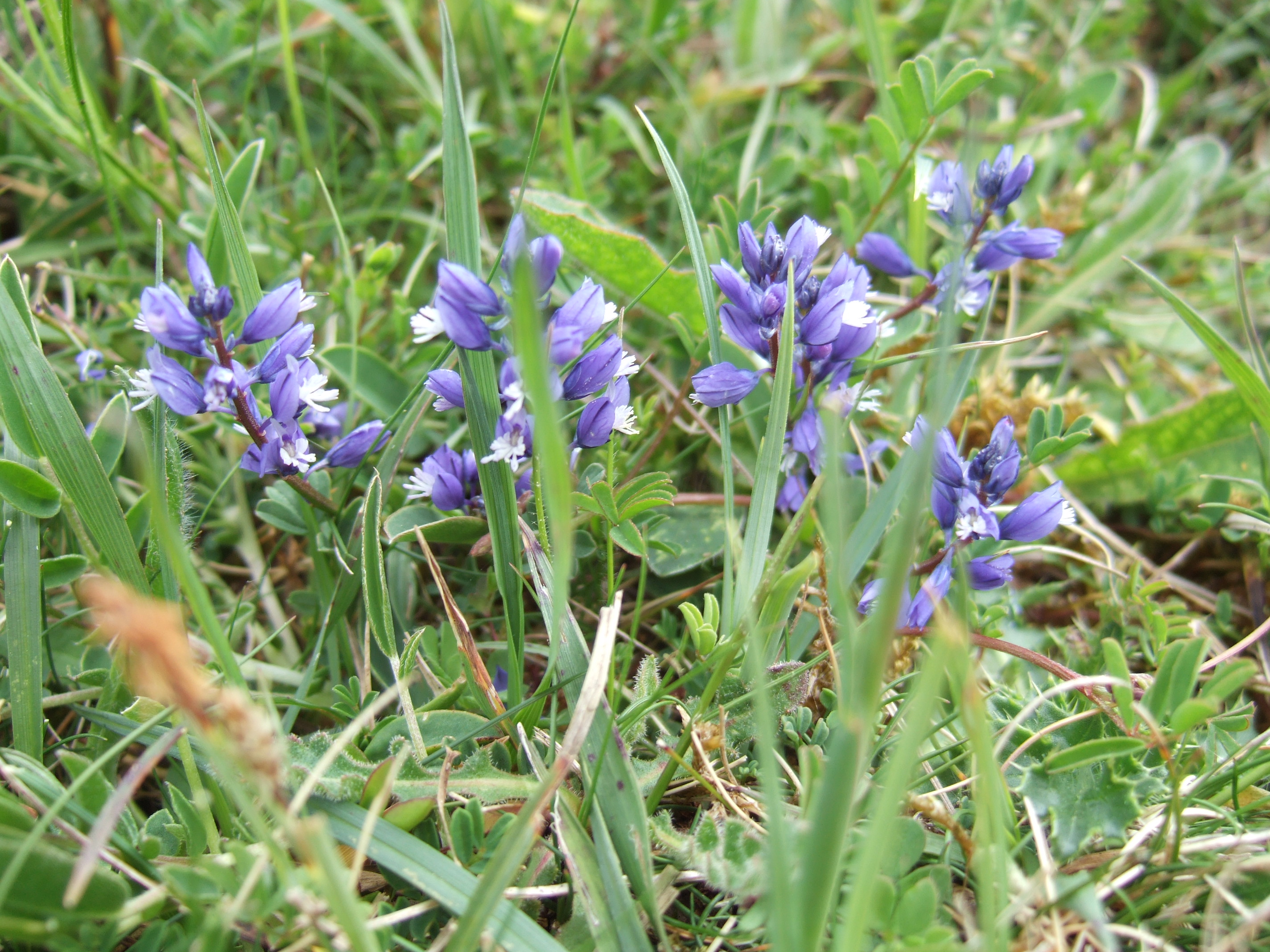
Blue form

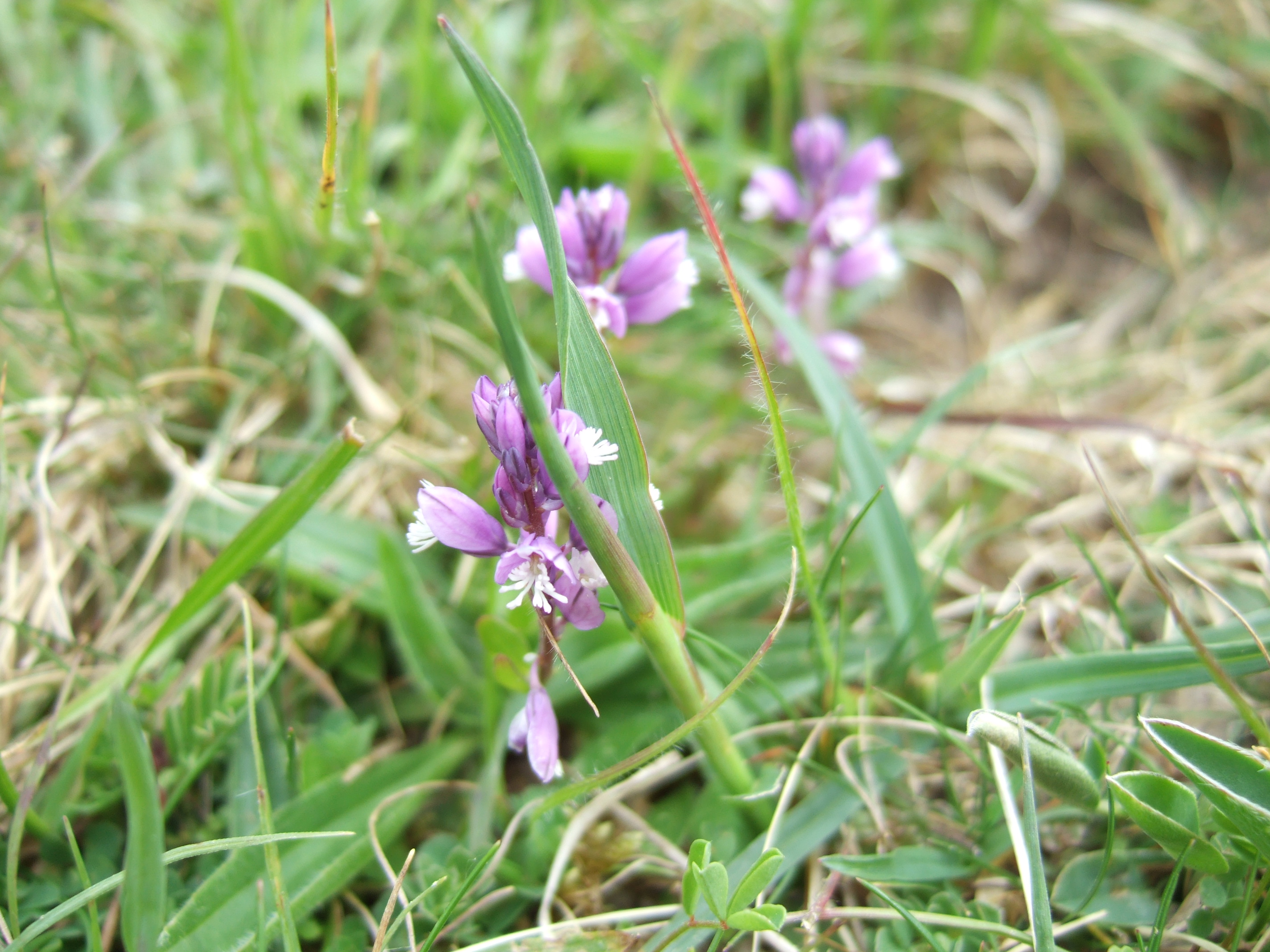
Mauve form

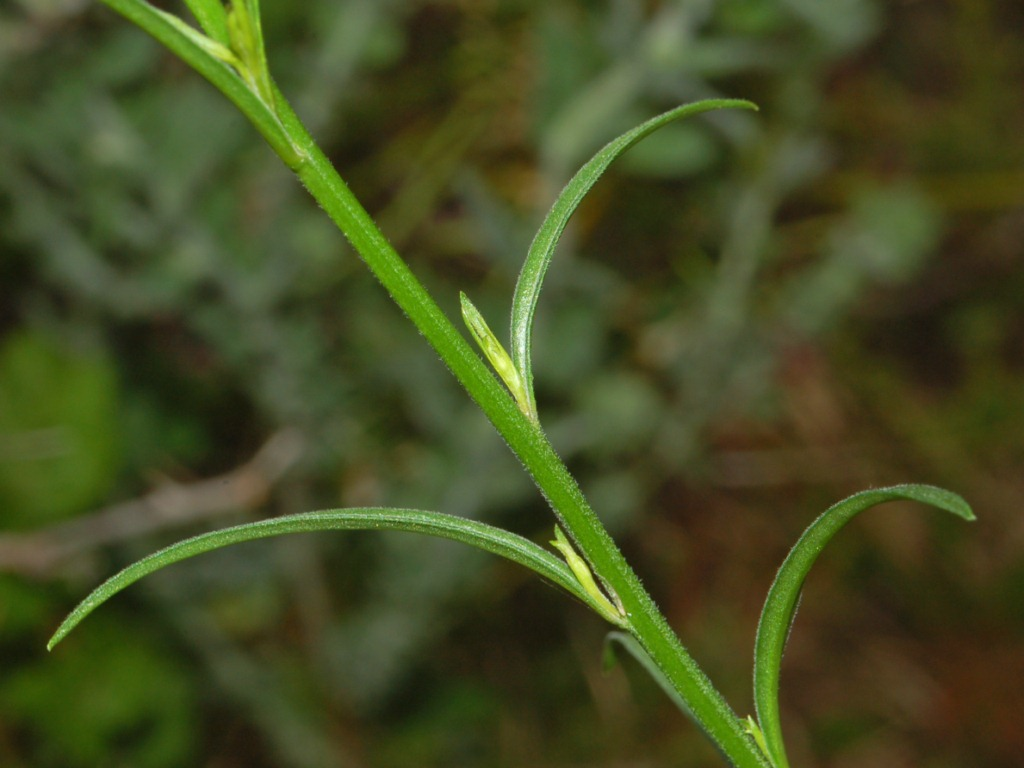
In Genoa

== See also ==
- List of Polygala species
