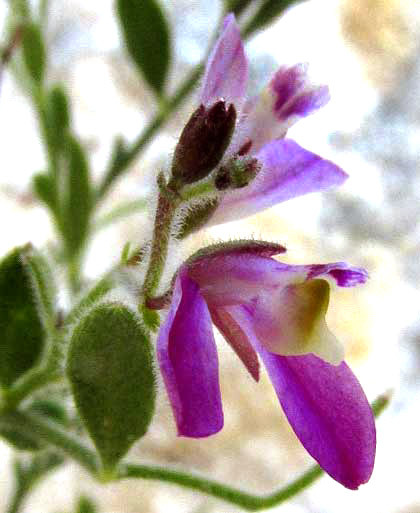
- Lindheimer's Milkwort flower and leaves

Scientific classification
- Kingdom: Plantae
- Clade: Tracheophytes
- Clade: Angiosperms
- Clade: Eudicots
- Clade: Rosids
- Order: Fabales
- Family: Polygalaceae
- Genus: Rhinotropis
- Species: R. lindheimeri

Binomial name
- Rhinotropis lindheimeri (A.Gray) J.R.Abbott

Synonyms
- Polygala lindheimeri A.Gray

= Rhinotropis lindheimeri =

Species of flowering plant

Rhinotropis lindheimeri, known as Lindheimer's milkwort or shrubby milkwort, is a species of flowering plant belonging to the family of the milkworts, the Polygalaceae.

== Description ==
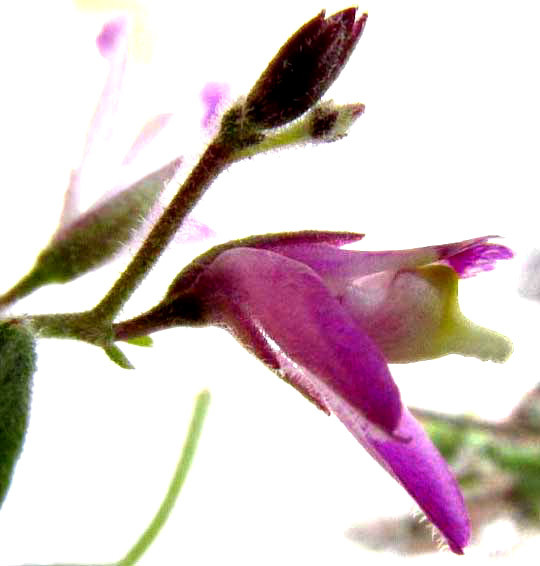
Lindheimer's Milkwort flower's sac with conspicuous beak

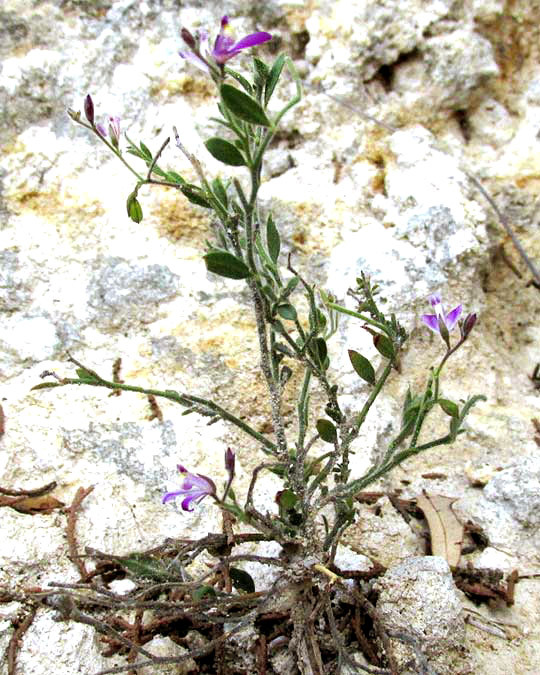
Lindheimer's Milkwort on a calcareous, nearly vertical cliff wall

At first glance, like other species of the genus Rhinotropis, flowers of Lindheimer's Milkwort look like papilionaceous blossoms of the vast Bean or Legume family. However, these differences in flower structure make clear that they're something else:

- Instead of petals forming the Legume Family's papilionaceous flower's corollas, in flowers of Lindheimer's Milkwort the top petal-like structure as well as the side "wings" are expanded sepals.
- Instead of the papilionaceous flower's two lowest petals being fused into a single "keel", in flowers of Rhinotropsis the keel is a single petal folded down the middle.
- Instead of the papilionaceous flower's 10 stamens, Rhinotropsis species have fewer stamens, which often are fused with the petals.

Lindheimer's Milkwort further displays these notable features:

- It's multi-stemmed, semi-woody and standing up to 35 cm (~14 inches) tall but, keeping to the ground, it can reach 1 meter in length (~3 1/3 feet).
- Leaves have very short petioles and blades of variable shapes up to 41 mm long and 18 mm wide (~1 2/3 x 3/4 inches).
- Raceme-type inflorescences occur at stem tips and near the plant's base, the basal ones sometimes with reduced, cleistogamos or semi-cleistogamos flowers.
- Flowers usually are pink to purple, rarely white, the lowest petal, or "keel", with a yellowish tip.
- The keel forms a curved "sac" enclosing the stamens and style.
- The sac bears a pointed, cylindrical projection, the "beak".
- Fruits, unlike legumes of the Legume Family, are capsules.

== Distribution ==
In the US, Lindheimer's Milkwort occurs from southern Arizona east to south-central Texas, south into Mexico.

In northern Mexico, the species occurs in the state of Chihuahua east to Tamaulipas, and south to the states of Aguascalientes, Querétaro and Veracruz.

== Habitat ==
In the US, the typical variety lindheimeri inhabits limestone or caliche, sandstone, shale, and sometimes gypsum, granite, and on igneous substrates on ridge tops, slopes, roadcuts, and in canyons in juniper-oak woodlands, grassland, thorn scrub, desert scrub, and canyon brush, up to 1600 meters in elevation (~5250 feet). The variety parvifolia inhabits rocky or clay soils of limestone or igneous origin, infrequently on gypseous substrates, occasionally in rock crevices of open slopes, ridge tops, canyons, savannas, desert grasslands, oak- pinyon woodlands, and chaparral at elevations up to 2400 meters in elevation (~7900 feet).

In Mexico, Rhinotropis lindheimeri is listed as occurring in a forest dominated by Pinyon Pine in the mountains of Coahuila state.

== Taxonomy ==
In 2026, these varieties were accepted:

- Rhinotropis lindheimeri var. eucosma (S.F.Blake) J.R.Abbott
- Rhinotropis lindheimeri var. lindheimeri
- Rhinotropis lindheimeri var. parvifolia (Wheelock) J.R.Abbott

Pictures on this page showing a plant with vegetative parts densely covered with erect, long hairs appear to depict the typical variety, Rhinotropis lindheimeri var. lindheimeri.

In 2011, based on phylogenetic analysis, J. Richard Abbott erected the genus Rhinotropsis and transferred Polygala lindheimeri to it, resulting in Rhinotropis lindheimeri. The new genus had been traditionally recognized as an infrageneric taxon of Polygala.

Polygala lindheimeri first had been described by Asa Gray, from a plant on the "Rocky declivities of the upper Guadaloupe and Pierdenales."

=== Etymology ===
The genus name Rhinotropis was constructed of the Greek rhinos, meaning "snout", and tropis, meaning "keel", referring to the flower's keel, which is the lowest petal, shaped like a boat's keel or maybe a scoop.

The species name lindheimeri honors Ferdinand Lindheimer, who collected the type specimen upon which the species is based.
