= Polygala kuriensis =

Conservation status
- Vulnerable (IUCN 3.1)

Scientific classification
- Kingdom: Plantae
- Clade: Tracheophytes
- Clade: Angiosperms
- Clade: Eudicots
- Clade: Rosids
- Order: Fabales
- Family: Polygalaceae
- Genus: Polygala
- Species: P. kuriensis

Binomial name
- Polygala kuriensis A.G.Mill.

Species of flowering plant

Polygala kuriensis is a species of plant in the family Polygalaceae. It is endemic to the island of Abd al Kuri in Yemen's Socotra Archipelago. Its natural habitats are subtropical or tropical dry shrubland and rocky areas.
