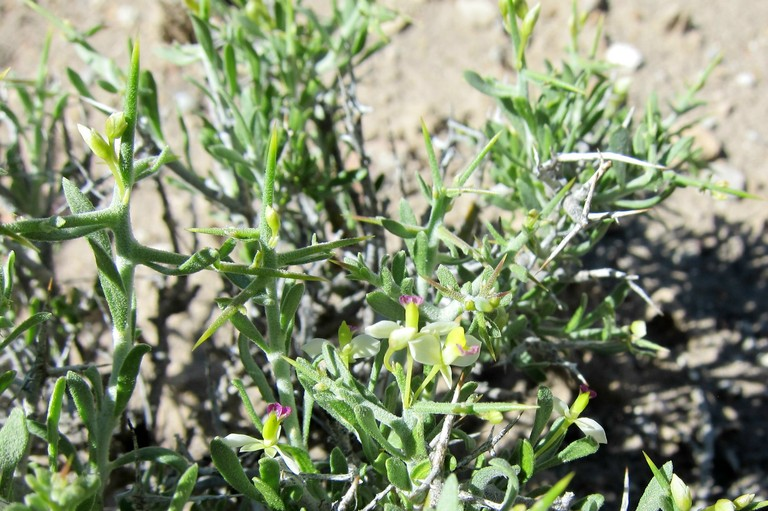

Conservation status
- Apparently Secure (NatureServe)

Scientific classification
- Kingdom: Plantae
- Clade: Tracheophytes
- Clade: Angiosperms
- Clade: Eudicots
- Clade: Rosids
- Order: Fabales
- Family: Polygalaceae
- Genus: Rhinotropis
- Species: R. acanthoclada

Binomial name
- Rhinotropis acanthoclada (A.Gray) J.R.Abbott

Synonyms
- Polygala acanthoclada A.Gray

= Rhinotropis acanthoclada =

Species of flowering plant

Rhinotropis acanthoclada, synonym Polygala acanthoclada, is a species of flowering plant in the milkwort family known by the common names desert polygala and thorn milkwort. It is native to the desert woodlands of the southwestern United States from Utah to the Mojave Desert. It is a small, bushy shrub spreading or growing erect and approaching one meter in maximum height. It is hairy in texture, the youngest twigs hairiest with a feltlike coat of short, whitish fibers. The lance-shaped or oval leaves are up to 2.5 centimeters long. Some of the twigs narrow to spines at the tips, especially in the inflorescences. The flowers are solitary or in clusters of up to 15. Each flower has five sepals, the lateral two white in color and spreading out like wings. The middle petal is keeled, with a flat tip protruding. The fruit is a capsule about half a centimeter long.
