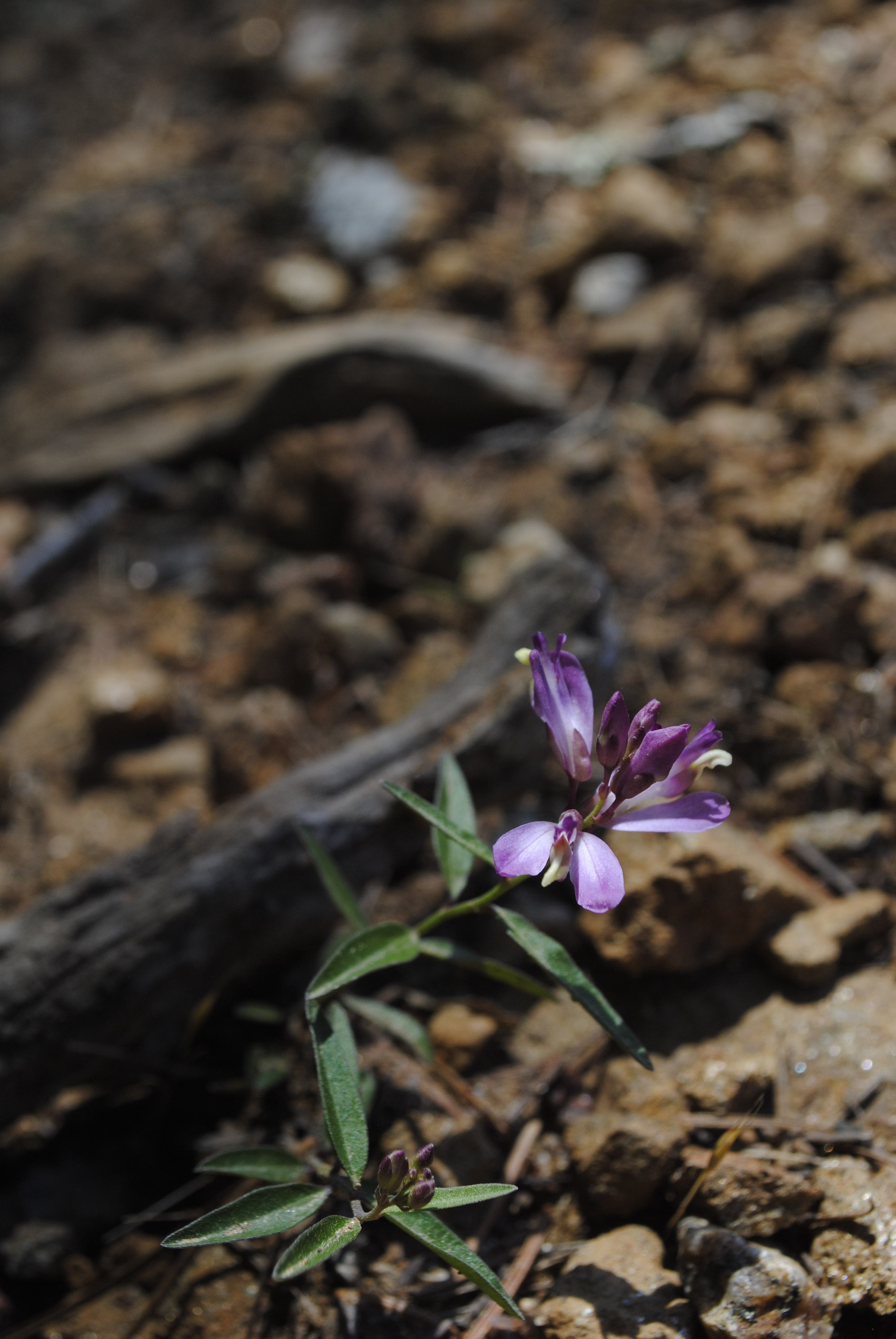

Scientific classification
- Kingdom: Plantae
- Clade: Tracheophytes
- Clade: Angiosperms
- Clade: Eudicots
- Clade: Rosids
- Order: Fabales
- Family: Polygalaceae
- Genus: Rhinotropis
- Species: R. californica

Binomial name
- Rhinotropis californica (Nutt.) J.R.Abbott

Synonyms
- Polygala californica Nutt.

= Rhinotropis californica =

Species of flowering plant

Rhinotropis californica, synonym Polygala californica, is a species of flowering plant in the milkwort family known by the common name California milkwort. It is native to southwestern Oregon and northern and central California, where it grows in the coastal mountain ranges in local habitat types such as chaparral and forest. It is a perennial herb producing spreading stems, generally decumbent in form, up to about 35 centimeters in maximum length, lined with narrow oval leaves each a few centimeter long. The upper inflorescences produce several open flowers, and there may be some closed, cleistogamous flowers lower on the plant. The open flowers have pink or white winglike lateral sepals with hairy edges. The petals are similar in color, the central one tipped with a white or yellow beak. The fruit is a flattened green capsule up to a centimeter long containing hairy seeds.
