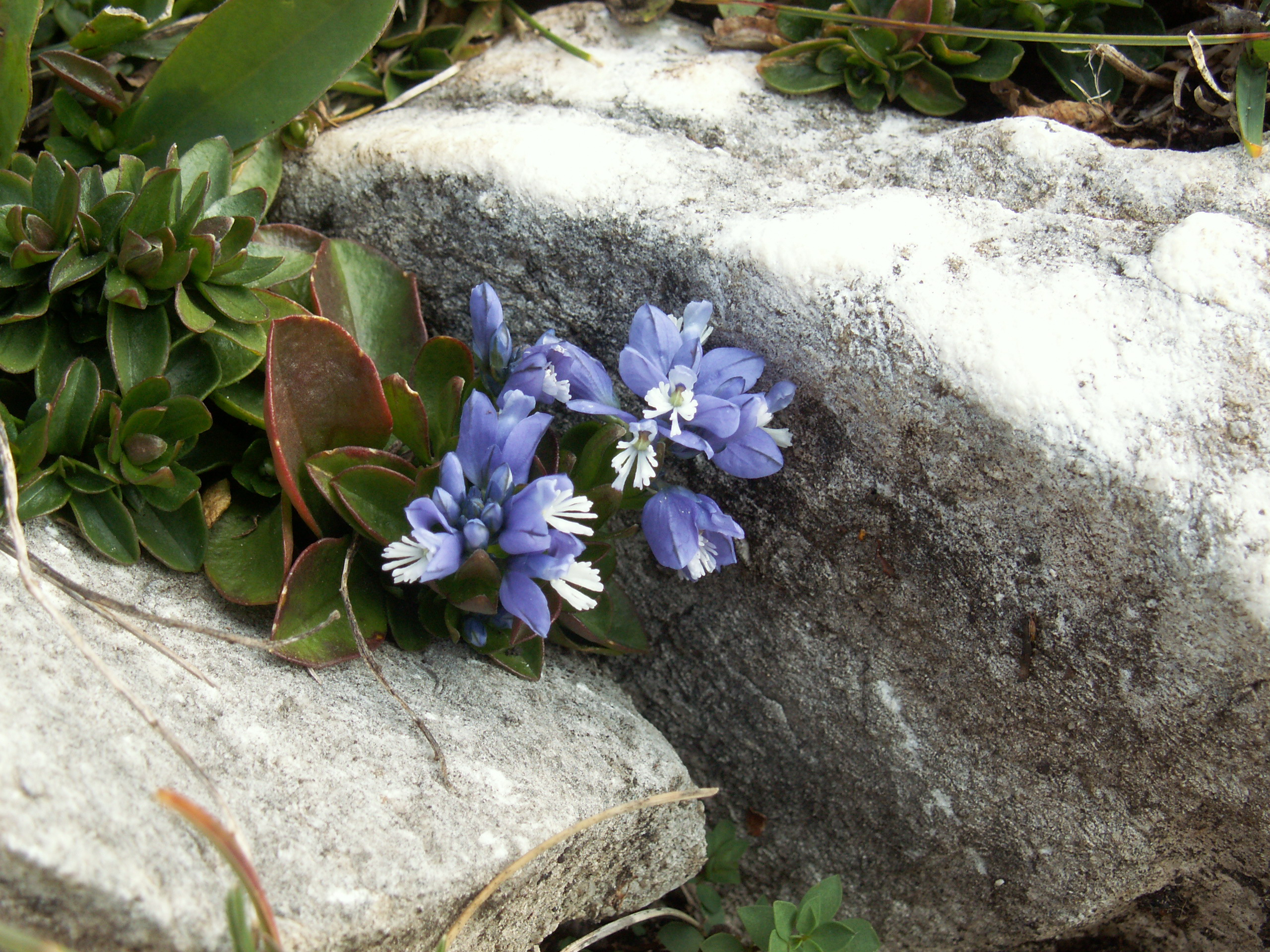

Scientific classification
- Kingdom: Plantae
- Clade: Embryophytes
- Clade: Tracheophytes
- Clade: Spermatophytes
- Clade: Angiosperms
- Clade: Eudicots
- Clade: Rosids
- Order: Fabales
- Family: Polygalaceae
- Genus: Polygala
- Species: P. calcarea

Binomial name
- Polygala calcarea F.W.Schultz

= Polygala calcarea =

Species of flowering plant

Polygala calcarea, the chalk milkwort, is a species of flowering plant in the family Polygalaceae, native to western Europe. It is a delicate mat-forming evergreen perennial growing to 5 cm (2 in) tall by 20 cm (8 in) broad, with spikes of small, vivid deep blue flowers in spring, and leathery, oval leaves.

== Etymology ==
The specific epithet calcarea means "relating to lime", though this plant will grow in a range of soils.

== Cultivation ==
It prefers sharply drained conditions, and is suitable for cultivation in an alpine garden.

== Cultivars ==
The cultivar 'Lillet' has gained the Royal Horticultural Society's Award of Garden Merit.
