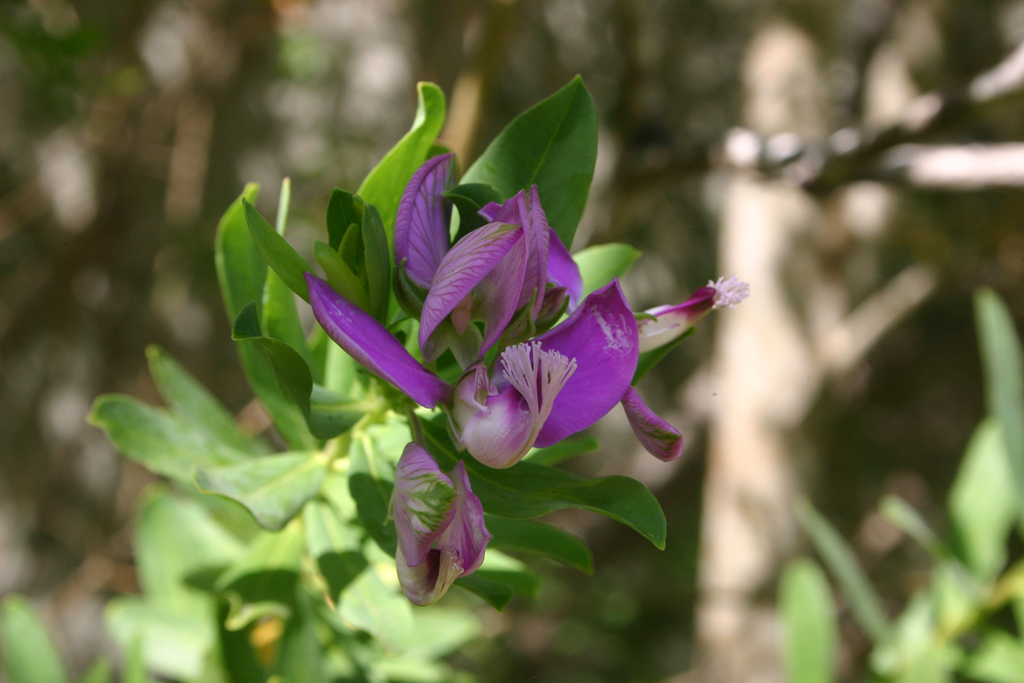
- Flowers of Polygala myrtifolia

Scientific classification
- Kingdom: Plantae
- Clade: Tracheophytes
- Clade: Angiosperms
- Clade: Eudicots
- Clade: Rosids
- Order: Fabales
- Family: Polygalaceae
- Genus: Polygala
- Species: P. myrtifolia

Binomial name
- Polygala myrtifolia L.

= Polygala myrtifolia =

Species of shrub

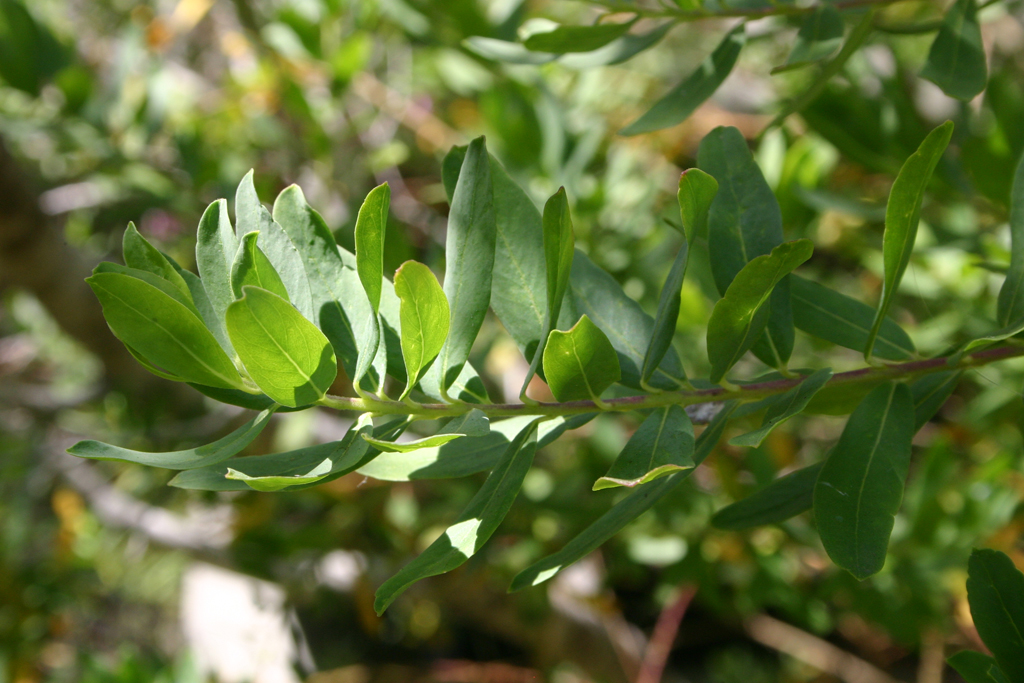
Foliage - Nature's Valley, South Africa

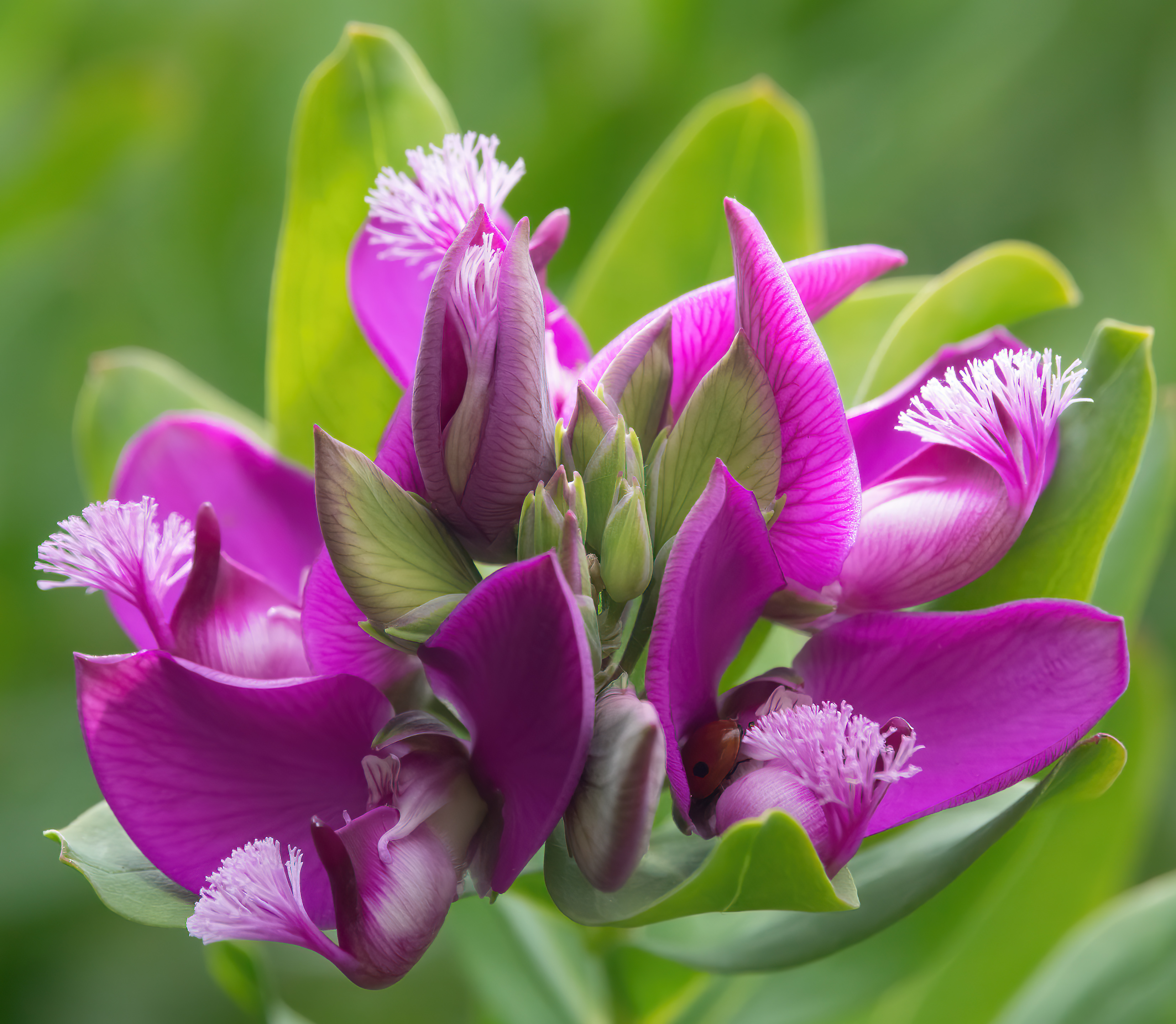
Flowers

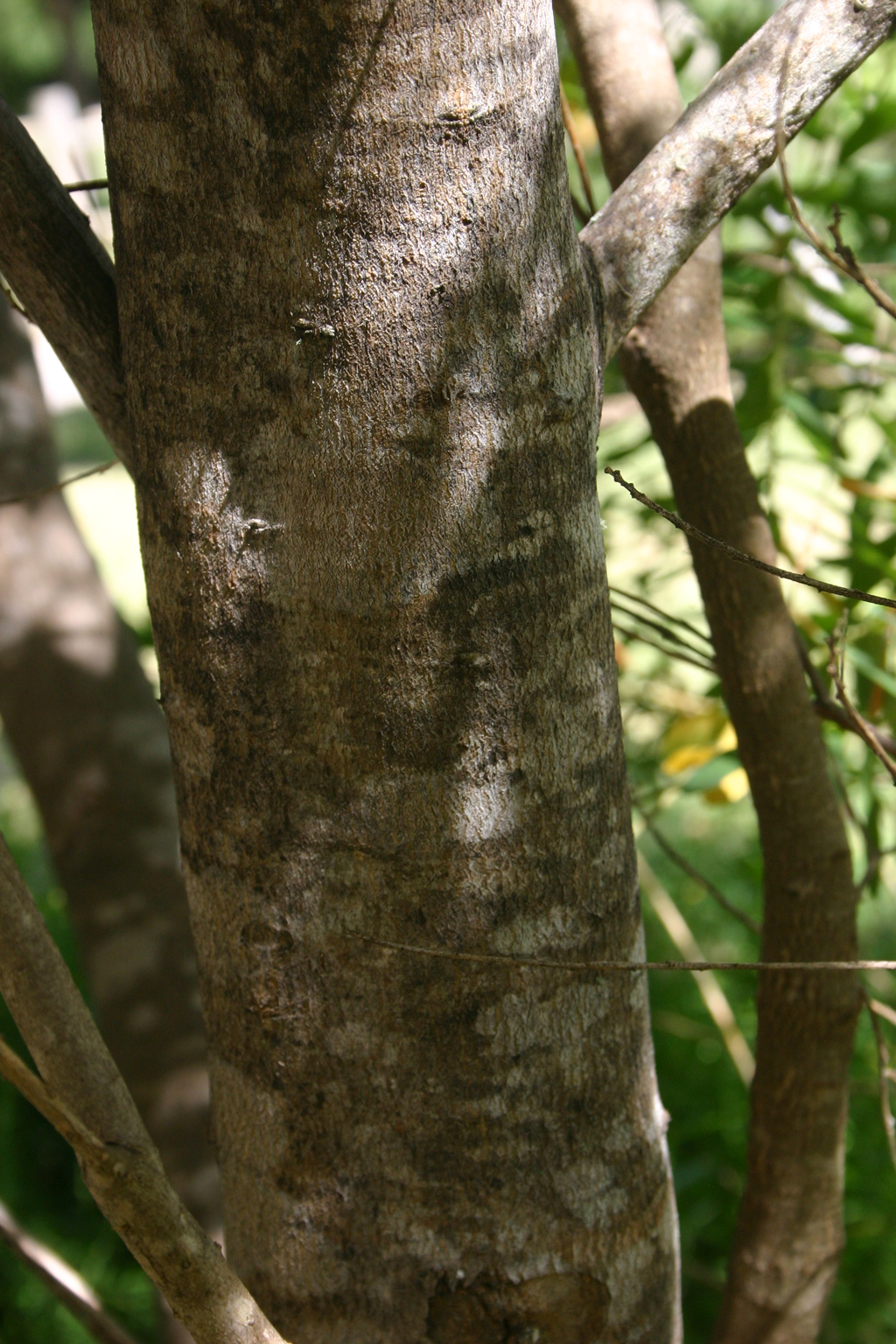
Bark - Nature's Valley, South Africa

Polygala myrtifolia, the myrtle-leaf milkwort, is an evergreen 2–4 m tall South African shrub or small tree found along the southern and south-eastern coasts, from near Clanwilliam in the Western Cape to KwaZulu-Natal. It is a fast-growing pioneer plant, a typical fynbos component, and may be found on dunes, rocky places, along forest margins, beside streams, and in open grassland. It belongs to the milkwort family of Polygalaceae.

The thin, oval, mucronate leaves, 25–50 mm long and up to 13 mm wide, are arranged alternately and have entire margins – some forms of P. myrtifolia have thin, needle-like leaves. The attractive mauve sweetpea-like flowers, which close at night, may also be pink, crimson or white, and have a characteristic brush-like tuft protruding from the keel. For pollination an intricate piston mechanism is used. The fruit is an oval, brown, dehiscent capsule which is narrowly winged. The species is often cultivated in South African gardens.

== Etymology ==
Polygala is interpreted as 'much milk' since the plant was thought to stimulate milk production in European cows. Myrtifolia translates as 'myrtle-shaped leaves'.

== Medicinal properties ==
The species is noted for its antibacterial and antifungal properties. Research conducted by the University of KwaZulu Natal found that aqueous extracts of P. myrtifolia proved effective against Candida albicans.

== Environmental impact ==
P. myrtifolia has become naturalised in coastal areas of California, New Zealand and Norfolk Island. In Australia, it is a significant environmental weed in coastal districts of Victoria and South Australia, and a moderately important environmental weed in New South Wales, Tasmania and Western Australia. In the 2010s, it was recently listed as a priority environmental weed in parts of Queensland.
