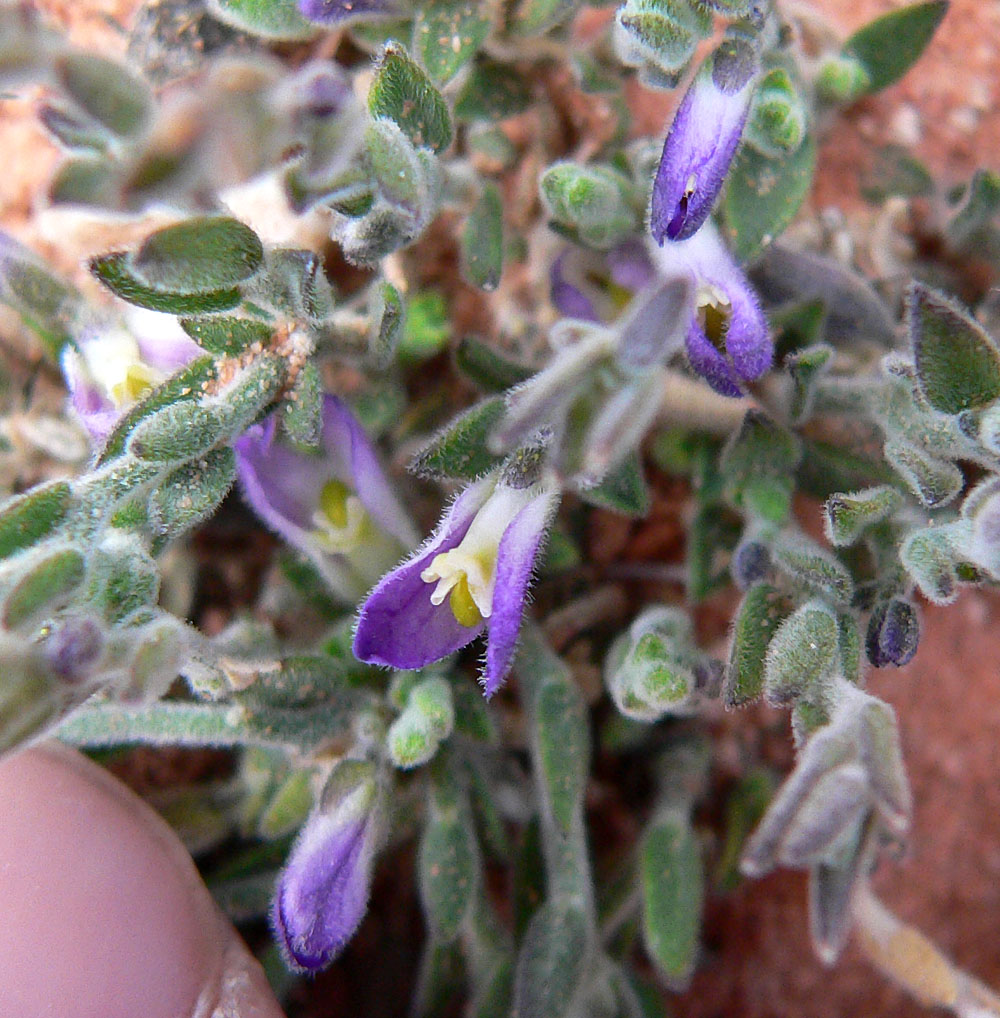

Scientific classification
- Kingdom: Plantae
- Clade: Tracheophytes
- Clade: Angiosperms
- Clade: Eudicots
- Clade: Rosids
- Order: Fabales
- Family: Polygalaceae
- Genus: Hebecarpa
- Species: H. macradenia

Binomial name
- Hebecarpa macradenia (A.Gray) J.R.Abbott

Synonyms
- Polygala glandulosopilosa Chodat; Polygala macradenia A.Gray; Polygala macradenia var. glandulosopilosa (Chodat) S.F.Blake

= Hebecarpa macradenia =

Species of flowering plant

Hebecarpa macradenia, synonym Polygala macradenia, the glandleaf milkwort, is a subshrub in the milkwort family (Polygalaceae) found in the Arizona Uplands of the Sonoran Desert. Its "odd" flowers are said to be "spectacularly beautiful" when viewed with a hand lens.
