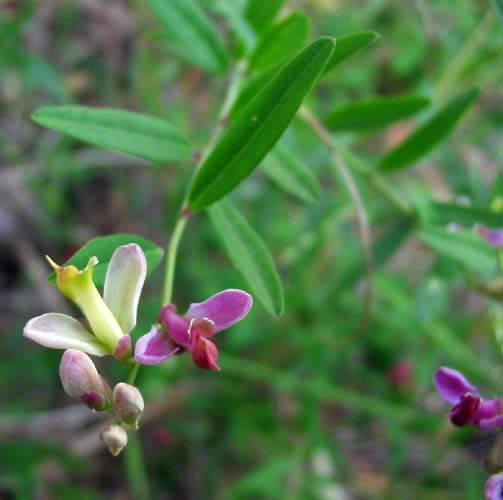

Scientific classification
- Kingdom: Plantae
- Clade: Tracheophytes
- Clade: Angiosperms
- Clade: Eudicots
- Clade: Rosids
- Order: Fabales
- Family: Polygalaceae
- Genus: Rhinotropis
- Species: R. cornuta

Binomial name
- Rhinotropis cornuta (Kellogg) J.R.Abbott

Synonyms
- Polygala cornuta Kellogg; Polygala fishiae Parry

= Rhinotropis cornuta =

Species of flowering plant

Rhinotropis cornuta, synonym Polygala cornuta, is a species of flowering plant in the milkwort family known by the common name Sierra milkwort. It is native to many of the mountain ranges of California and northern Baja California, where it grows in local habitat types such as chaparral and forest. It is a rhizomatous perennial herb or shrub known to exceed 2 meters in maximum height, spreading or growing erect. The leaves are linear, lance-shaped, or narrowly oval, up to 6.5 centimeters long, and widely spaced along the branches. The inflorescence is a short array of flowers varying in color from greenish or yellowish white to pink. Each has two winglike lateral sepals, and the keeled central petal is tipped with a short beak. The fruit is a brownish flattened capsule.
