= Rhinotropis heterorhyncha =

Scientific classification
- Kingdom: Plantae
- Clade: Tracheophytes
- Clade: Angiosperms
- Clade: Eudicots
- Clade: Rosids
- Order: Fabales
- Family: Polygalaceae
- Genus: Rhinotropis
- Species: R. heterorhyncha

Binomial name
- Rhinotropis heterorhyncha (Barneby) J.R.Abbott

Synonyms
- Polygala heterorhyncha (Barneby) T.Wendt

Species of flowering plant

Rhinotropis heterorhyncha, synonym Polygala heterorhyncha, is a species of flowering plant in the milkwort family known by the common names beaked spiny polygala and notch-beaked milkwort. It is native to southern Nevada and it is known from a few occurrences just over the border in the Funeral Mountains of California above Death Valley. It is a resident of desert scrub habitat. This desert plant is a perennial herb or small shrub growing in small clumpy mats. The thin, branching, thorny-tipped stems are somewhat waxy in texture and sometimes slightly hairy. They are lined sparsely with small oval, dull-pointed leaves. The inflorescence bears a few flowers, each with a winglike pair of bright pink sepals and a yellow-tipped central petal. The fruit is a vein-streaked capsule.
