= Rhinotropis intermontana =

Scientific classification
- Kingdom: Plantae
- Clade: Tracheophytes
- Clade: Angiosperms
- Clade: Eudicots
- Clade: Rosids
- Order: Fabales
- Family: Polygalaceae
- Genus: Rhinotropis
- Species: R. intermontana

Binomial name
- Rhinotropis intermontana (T.Wendt) J.R.Abbott

Synonyms
- Polygala intermontana T.Wendt

Species of flowering plant

Rhinotropis intermontana, synonym Polygala intermontana, is a species of flowering plant in the milkwort family known by the common name intermountain milkwort. It is native to the southwestern United States from Utah to northern Arizona and far eastern California, where it grows in desert scrub and woodland habitat. It is a small shrub growing erect or forming tangled, mats of thorny, highly branched stems. The stems are hairy in texture with white fibers. The sparse leaves are linear to oval in shape. The inflorescence bears one to seven flowers, each just a few millimeters in length. The flower has a winglike pair of greenish or whitish sepals and a keeled central petal.
