= Hebecarpa rectipilis =

Scientific classification
- Kingdom: Plantae
- Clade: Tracheophytes
- Clade: Angiosperms
- Clade: Eudicots
- Clade: Rosids
- Order: Fabales
- Family: Polygalaceae
- Genus: Hebecarpa
- Species: H. rectipilis

Binomial name
- Hebecarpa rectipilis (S.F.Blake) J.R.Abbott

Synonyms
- Polygala rectipilis S.F.Blake

Species of flowering plant

Hebecarpa rectipilis, synonym Polygala rectipilis, common name New Mexico milkwort, is a plant native to one county in New Mexico and to northeast Mexico. The type specimen was collected near the Town of Hillsboro in Sierra County, at an elevation of 1675 m (5500 feet).

Hebecarpa rectipilis is herbaceous and up to 30 cm (12 inches) tall. It has oblong to ovate leaves narrowing to a point at the tip. Flowers are borne in terminal racemes of as many as 20 flowers. Flowers are purple, up to 6 mm (0.24 inches) long.
