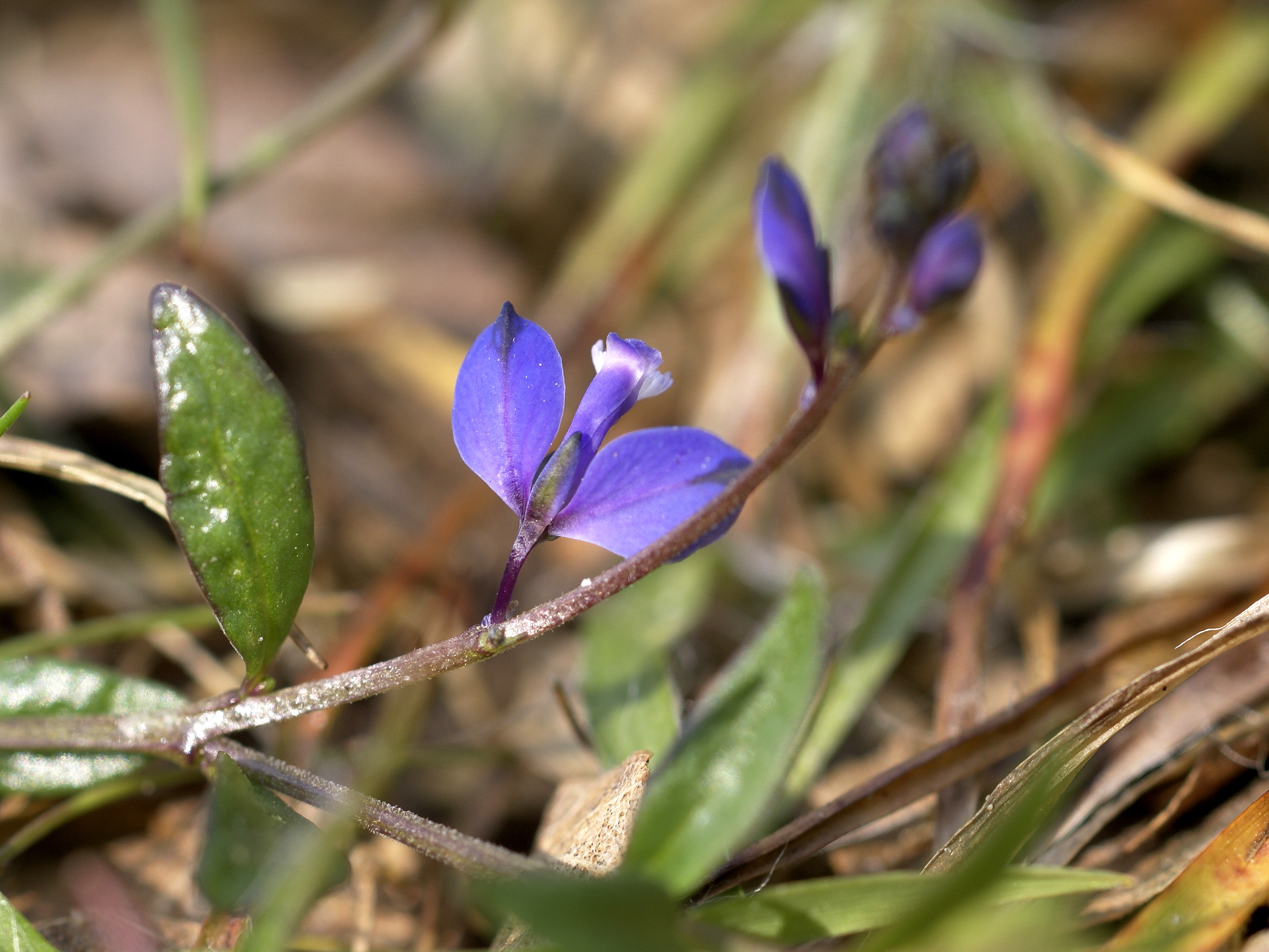

Scientific classification
- Kingdom: Plantae
- Clade: Tracheophytes
- Clade: Angiosperms
- Clade: Eudicots
- Clade: Rosids
- Order: Fabales
- Family: Polygalaceae
- Genus: Polygala
- Species: P. serpyllifolia

Binomial name
- Polygala serpyllifolia Hosé

= Polygala serpyllifolia =

Heath milkwort

Species of flowering plant

Polygala serpyllifolia, the heath milkwort, is a European native perennial of heaths and grassy places.

== Description ==
It grows to a height of 25 cm. The lower leaves are in opposite pairs. It flowers from May to August.
