= Carpolobia lutea =

Conservation status
- Least Concern (IUCN 3.1)

Scientific classification
- Kingdom: Plantae
- Clade: Embryophytes
- Clade: Tracheophytes
- Clade: Spermatophytes
- Clade: Angiosperms
- Clade: Eudicots
- Clade: Rosids
- Order: Fabales
- Family: Polygalaceae
- Genus: Carpolobia
- Species: C. lutea

Binomial name
- Carpolobia lutea G.Don

Synonyms
- Carpolobia caudata Burtt Davy

Species of flowering plant

Carpolobia lutea is a plant species in the milkwort family (Polygalaceae). It is native to rainforests and the banks of streams with altitudes below 400 m (1,300 ft) in coastal areas of West Africa. C. lutea was first formally named by George Don in 1831. According to the IUCN Red List, its population is stable and its conservation status is categorized as "least concern".

== Description ==
Carpolobia lutea is a shrub or small tree which can have a height of up to 15 ft (4.6 m).The petals of the plant's flowers are initially white with purple markings at the base of the upper petals before turning yellowish orange. It also produces fruits which are orange when ripe. It closely resembles C. alba.

== Uses ==
It is used by the local people as a stomach medicine, to cure bone fractures, and to boost male sexual performance. Some of its extracts were found to be effective against some bacterial and fungal strains. Its leaves are cultivated to be eaten as vegetables and the fruits are also eaten.
