= Monnina pseudoaestuans =

Conservation status
- Vulnerable (IUCN 3.1)

Scientific classification
- Kingdom: Plantae
- Clade: Tracheophytes
- Clade: Angiosperms
- Clade: Eudicots
- Clade: Rosids
- Order: Fabales
- Family: Polygalaceae
- Genus: Monnina
- Species: M. pseudoaestuans

Binomial name
- Monnina pseudoaestuans Ferreyra & Wurdack

Species of flowering plant

Monnina pseudoaestuans is a species of plant in the family Polygalaceae. It is endemic to Ecuador.
