= Atroxima afzeliana =

Scientific classification
- Kingdom: Plantae
- Clade: Embryophytes
- Clade: Tracheophytes
- Clade: Spermatophytes
- Clade: Angiosperms
- Clade: Eudicots
- Clade: Rosids
- Order: Fabales
- Family: Polygalaceae
- Genus: Atroxima
- Species: A. afzeliana

Binomial name
- Atroxima afzeliana (Oliv. ex Chodat) Stapf

Synonyms
- Atroxima congolana E.M.A.Petit; Atroxima macrostachya (Chodat) Stapf; Atroxima zenkeri (Gürke ex Stapf) Stapf; Carpolobia afzeliana Oliv.; Carpolobia macrostachya Chodat; Carpolobia zenkeri Gürke ex Stapf

Species of flowering plant

Atroxima afzeliana is a species of plant in the milkwort family (Polygalaceae). It is endemic to rainforests and forest fringes with altitudes below 200 metres (660 ft) in Western Tropical Africa. It was first described in 1868 by Daniel Oliver, at which point it was described as a new Carpolobia or a new genus. In 1905, Otto Stapf classified it into the atroxima genus.

== Description ==
Atroxima afzeliana is a glabrous tree or shrub with a height of up to 25 feet (7.6 m). It has sweeping branches and is sometimes scandent. Its leaves are leathery and elliptical. They are 2.5 to 4 inches (6.4 to 10.2 cm) long and 1.25 to 2 inches (3.2 to 5.1 cm) wide. It produces 6 to 10 flowers which are mauve or cream-coloured. It produces an orange, roughly spherical, crustaceous fruit which is about 1 inch (2.5 cm) in diameter and edible.

== Uses ==
Apart from the fruit being edible, the stem, root, and leaves of the plant are used as medicine to treat various illnesses.
