= Violet tree =

Violet tree may refer to the following plant species:

- Phlebotaenia cowellii, syn. Polygala cowellii
- Securidaca longepedunculata
