= Asemeia marquesiana =

Scientific classification
- Kingdom: Plantae
- Clade: Tracheophytes
- Clade: Angiosperms
- Clade: Eudicots
- Clade: Rosids
- Order: Fabales
- Family: Polygalaceae
- Genus: Asemeia
- Species: A. marquesiana

Binomial name
- Asemeia marquesiana (J.F.B.Pastore & J.R.Abbott) J.F.B.Pastore & J.R.Abbott

Synonyms
- Polygala marquesiana J.F.B.Pastore & T.B.Cavalc.

Species of flowering plant

Asemeia marquesiana, commonly known as Marques' asemeia, is a species of flowering plant belonging to the family Polygalaceae.

It was first described in 2008 by American botanist, John Richard Abbott and Brazilian botanist, José Floriano Barêa Pastore. This evergreen shrub species is native to the Brazilian Atlantic Forest and grows in moist habitats, such as riverbanks and wetlands.
