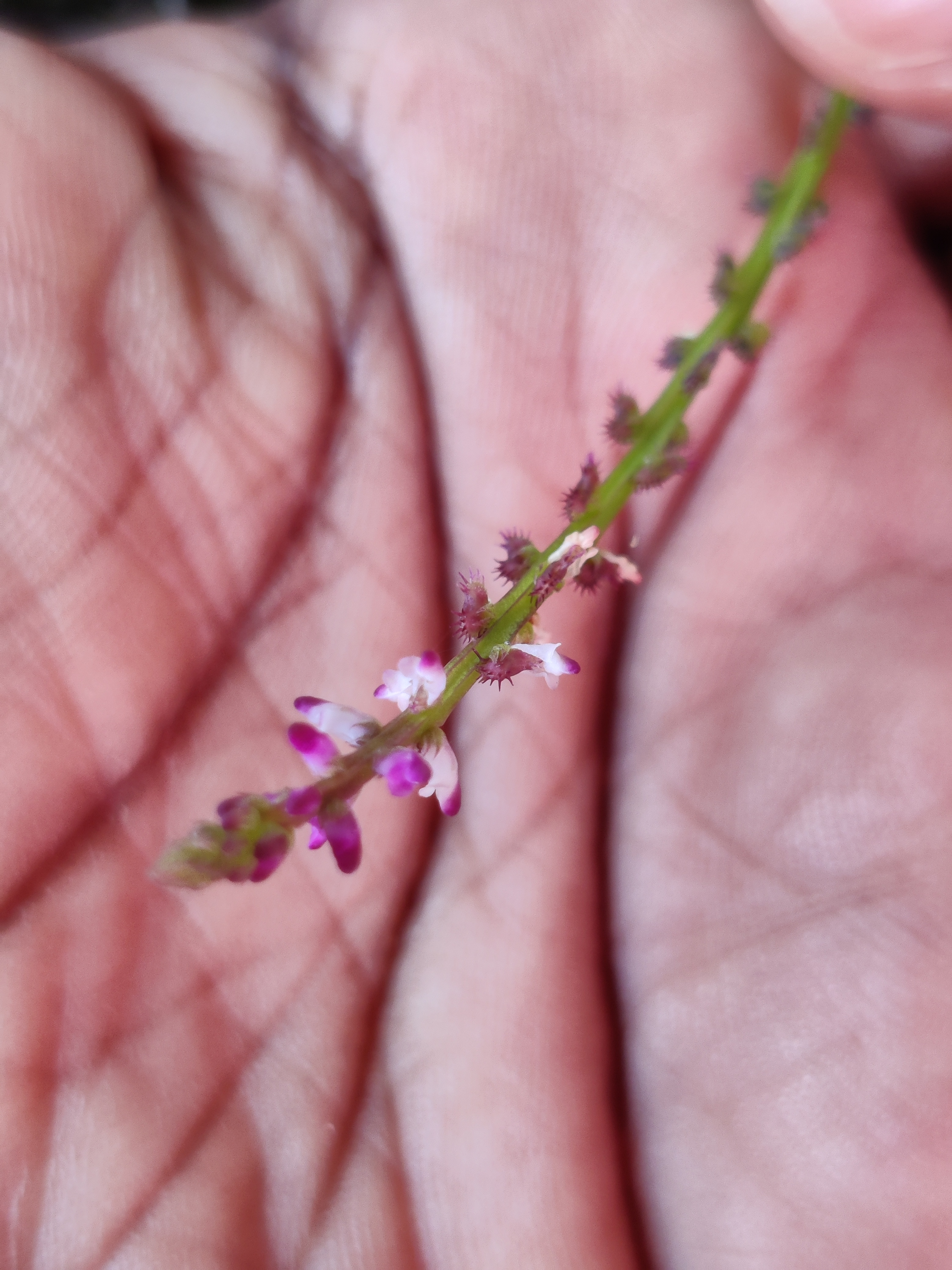

Scientific classification
- Kingdom: Plantae
- Clade: Tracheophytes
- Clade: Angiosperms
- Clade: Eudicots
- Clade: Rosids
- Order: Fabales
- Family: Polygalaceae
- Genus: Salomonia
- Species: S. ciliata

Binomial name
- Salomonia ciliata (L.) DC.

Synonyms
- List: Polygala ciliata L.; Amorpha pedalis Blanco; Polygala arnottiana Hassk.; Polygala arvensis Roxb.; Polygala canarana A.W.Benn.; Salomonia angulata Griff.; Salomonia arnottiana Miq.; Salomonia canarana Hassk.; Salomonia cavaleriei H.Lév.; Salomonia ciliata f. oblongifolia (DC.) V.S.Raju; Salomonia ciliata f. pubescens H.Koyama; Salomonia cordata Arn.; Salomonia crabiformis H.Koyama; Salomonia horneri Hassk.; Salomonia leptostachya Wall.; Salomonia oblongifolia DC.; Salomonia obovata Wight; Salomonia ramosissima Turcz.; Salomonia rigida Hassk.; Salomonia sessilifolia D.Don; Salomonia setosociliata Hassk.; Salomonia stricta Siebold & Zucc.; Salomonia uncinata Hassk.

= Salomonia ciliata =

Species of flowering plant

Salomonia ciliata is a flowering plant belonging to the family Polygalaceae. It is an annual herb native to tropical & subtropical Asia to Queensland. The plant is commonly known as fringed-leaf milkwort or oblong-leaf salomonia. Leaves are simple and alternate. The stems are erect or ascending and angular. Roots are aromatic.
