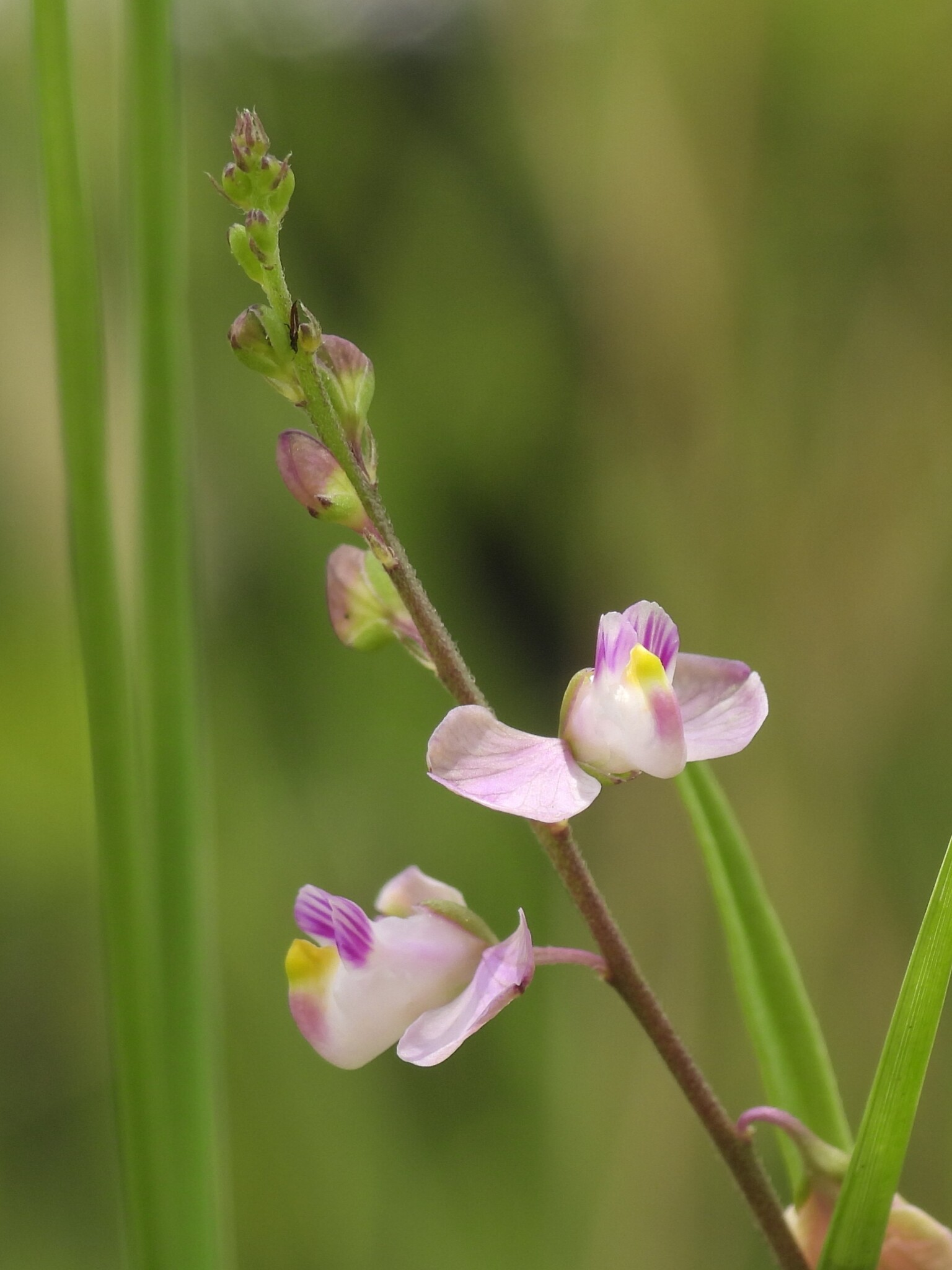
- In Orange County, Florida

Conservation status
- Secure (NatureServe)

Scientific classification
- Kingdom: Plantae
- Clade: Tracheophytes
- Clade: Angiosperms
- Clade: Eudicots
- Clade: Rosids
- Order: Fabales
- Family: Polygalaceae
- Genus: Asemeia
- Species: A. grandiflora

Binomial name
- Asemeia grandiflora (Walter) Small

Synonyms
- Polygala grandiflora

= Asemeia grandiflora =

Species of flowering plant

Asemeia grandiflora, commonly known as showy milkwort, is a species of perennial flower found in North America. Previously known as Polygala grandiflora, the name of this species was changed to the currently-used Asemeia grandiflora in 2012.

== Description ==
A. grandiflora is an herb that reaches between 25 and 50 cm (9.8 and 19.7 in) in height. The species' leaves are alternately arranged and oblanceolate to linear-oblanceolate in shape, reaching a length between 1.5 and 5 cm (0.6 and 2.0 in) and a width between 2 and 17 mm (0.08 and 0.67 in). They are pubescent underneath, most notably on the veins.

The racemes range in length from 5 to 17 cm (2.0 to 6.7 in). The wings either side of the flower are pink in color and 5 to 17 mm (0.20 to 0.67 in) in length. The flower itself is similar in color but smaller in size. A. grandiflora's sepals are 1.5 to 2 mm (0.06 to 0.08 in) in length and green in color. The seeds are approximately 2 mm (0.08 in) long and black in color. A. grandiflora tends to bloom during the summer months and fruits shortly thereafter.

== Taxonomy ==
Asemeia grandiflora was scientifically named Polygala grandiflora by the botanist Thomas Walter in 1788. It was moved to the genus Asemeia by John Kunkel Small in 1933, giving the species its accepted name. At the time this move was not widely accepted by botanists, but genetic research in the 2000s showed that Asemeia to be a distinct group and the name was revived in a paper in 2012. Asemeia grandiflora has no accepted varieties, but has 30 synonyms including seven varieties and 22 species names.

Table of Synonyms
| Name | Year | Rank | Notes |
|---|---|---|---|
| Asemeia carnea Raf. | 1838 | species | = het. |
| Asemeia cumulicola (Small) Small | 1933 | species | = het. |
| Asemeia leiodes (S.F.Blake) Small | 1933 | species | = het. |
| Asemeia miamiensis (Small) Small | 1933 | species | = het. |
| Asemeia rosea (Michx.) Raf. | 1838 | species | = het., nom. superfl. |
| Badiera berteroana Spreng. | 1826 | species | = het. |
| Polygala ambigens S.F.Blake | 1923 | species | = het. |
| Polygala americana Seem. | 1856 | species | = het., nom. illeg. |
| Polygala bahamensis S.F.Blake | 1916 | species | = het. |
| Polygala collina Brandegee | 1905 | species | = het. |
| Polygala corallicola Small | 1905 | species | = het. |
| Polygala cubensis Chodat | 1893 | species | = het. |
| Polygala cumulicola Small | 1924 | species | = het. |
| Polygala domingensis Bertero ex Spreng. | 1826 | species | = het., not validly publ. |
| Polygala flabellata Shuttlew. ex Chodat | 1893 | species | = het. |
| Polygala grandiflora Walter | 1788 | species | ≡ hom. |
| Polygala grandiflora var. angustifolia Torr. & A.Gray | 1840 | variety | = het. |
| Polygala grandiflora var. canescens Shuttlew. ex A.Gray | 1852 | variety | = het. |
| Polygala grandiflora subsp. krugii (Chodat) Nauman | 1981 | subspecies | = het. |
| Polygala grandiflora var. leiodes S.F.Blake | 1924 | variety | = het. |
| Polygala grandiflora var. leptophylla Chodat | 1893 | variety | = het. |
| Polygala grandiflora var. orbicularis Chodat | 1893 | variety | = het. |
| Polygala grandiflora var. pubescens Chodat | 1893 | variety | = het., nom. superfl. |
| Polygala krugii Chodat | 1893 | species | = het. |
| Polygala miamiensis Small | 1924 | species | = het. |
| Polygala muhlenbergii G.Don | 1831 | species | = het. |
| Polygala pubescens Muhl. ex Nutt. | 1818 | species | = het., nom. illeg. |
| Polygala senega var. rosea Michx. | 1803 | variety | = het. |
| Polygala versicolor Willd. ex Steud. | 1841 | species | = het., not validly publ. |
| Polygala wrightii Chodat | 1893 | species | = het. |
Notes: ≡ homotypic synonym; = heterotypic synonym

== Distribution and habitat ==
This species is native to the southeastern region of the United States of America. Its range encompasses North Carolina south to Florida and westward to Louisiana.

Within this range it may be found in habitats such as longleaf pine sandhills, savannas, and calcareous glades. They are commonly found in mesic environments and areas with dry, sandy soils.
