= Monrosia pterolopha =

Scientific classification
- Kingdom: Plantae
- Clade: Tracheophytes
- Clade: Angiosperms
- Clade: Eudicots
- Clade: Rosids
- Order: Fabales
- Family: Polygalaceae
- Genus: Monrosia
- Species: M. pterolopha

Binomial name
- Monrosia pterolopha (Chodat) Grondona

Synonyms
- Polygala pterolopha Chodat

Species of flowering plant

Monrosia pterolopha is a species of flowering plant in the family Polygalaceae. It is a subshrub native to Catamarca, La Rioja, and San Juan provinces of northwestern Argentina, where it grows in subalpine areas of the Andes.

The species was first described as Polygala pterolopha by Robert Hippolyte Chodat in 1893. In 1949 Eduardo M. Grondona placed it in the newly-described genus Monrosia.
