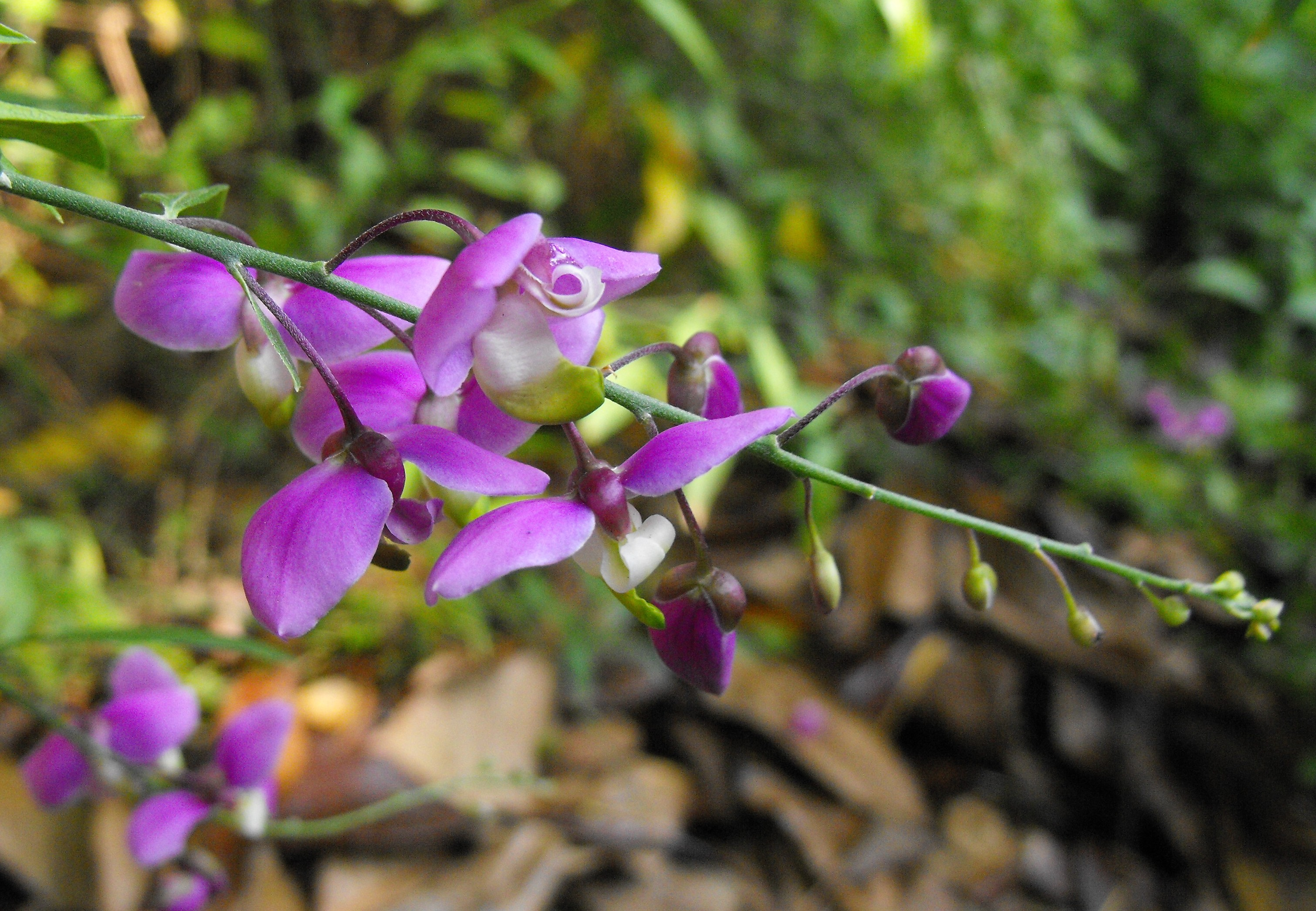

Scientific classification
- Kingdom: Plantae
- Clade: Tracheophytes
- Clade: Angiosperms
- Clade: Eudicots
- Clade: Rosids
- Order: Fabales
- Family: Polygalaceae
- Genus: Asemeia
- Species: A. apopetala

Binomial name
- Asemeia apopetala (Brandegee) J.F.B.Pastore & J.R.Abbott

Synonyms
- Polygala apopetala Brandegee, Proc. Calif. Acad. Sci., ser. 2, 2: 130 (1889)

= Asemeia apopetala =

Brandegee milkwort

Species of flowering plant

Asemeia apopetala is a species of flowering plant in the milkwort family commonly known as Brandegee milkwort or rama mora. It is a shrub or a small tree characterized by showy pink to magenta flowers that bloom from September to November or any time of year with ample rainfall. It was first described in 1889 and is endemic to Baja California Sur, Mexico. It is the type for the subgenus Apopetala of Asemeia.

== Distribution and habitat ==
This species is endemic to Baja California Sur, Mexico. It ranges from the Sierra de San Francisco in the northern part of the state south through the Sierra de la Giganta and the Sierra de la Laguna of the Cape region. It is typically found growing on rocky hillsides and canyon walls.
