= Monnina fosbergii =

Conservation status
- Critically Endangered (IUCN 3.1)

Scientific classification
- Kingdom: Plantae
- Clade: Tracheophytes
- Clade: Angiosperms
- Clade: Eudicots
- Clade: Rosids
- Order: Fabales
- Family: Polygalaceae
- Genus: Monnina
- Species: M. fosbergii

Binomial name
- Monnina fosbergii Ferreyra

Synonyms
- Pteromonnina fosbergii (Ferreyra) B.Eriksen

Species of flowering plant

Monnina fosbergii is a species of plant in the family Polygalaceae. It is endemic to Ecuador.
