= Securidaca leiocarpa =

Conservation status
- Vulnerable (IUCN 3.1)

Scientific classification
- Kingdom: Plantae
- Clade: Tracheophytes
- Clade: Angiosperms
- Clade: Eudicots
- Clade: Rosids
- Order: Fabales
- Family: Polygalaceae
- Genus: Securidaca
- Species: S. leiocarpa

Binomial name
- Securidaca leiocarpa S.F.Blake

Species of flowering plant

Securidaca leiocarpa is a species of plant in the family Polygalaceae. It is endemic to Ecuador.
