= Ancylotropis =

Ancylotropis may refer to:

- Ancylotropis (beetle), a genus of beetles in the family Anthribidae
- Ancylotropis (plant), a genus of flowering plants in the family Polygalaceae
