= Securidaca dolod =

Scientific classification
- Kingdom: Plantae
- Clade: Tracheophytes
- Clade: Angiosperms
- Clade: Eudicots
- Clade: Rosids
- Order: Fabales
- Family: Polygalaceae
- Genus: Securidaca
- Species: S. dolod

Binomial name
- Securidaca dolod B.Walln.

Species of plant

Securidaca dolod is a species of flowering plant in the family Polygalaceae, native to Peru. It is a rainforest liana, reaching 25 m (82 ft) into the canopy.
