= Salomonia cantoniensis =

Scientific classification
- Kingdom: Plantae
- Clade: Tracheophytes
- Clade: Angiosperms
- Clade: Eudicots
- Clade: Rosids
- Order: Fabales
- Family: Polygalaceae
- Genus: Salomonia
- Species: S. cantoniensis

Binomial name
- Salomonia cantoniensis Lour.

Synonyms
- Homotypic Synonyms: Salmonea cantoniensis (Lour.) Vahl; Heterotypic Synonyms: Polygala trinervata Buch.-Ham. ex Wall.; Polygala undulata Roxb.; Salomonia cantoniensis var. edentula (DC.) Gagnep.; Salomonia edentula DC.; Salomonia petiolata Buch.-Ham. ex D.Don; Salomonia subrotunda Hassk.; Salomonia trinervata Steud.

Species of flowering plant

Salomonia cantoniensis is a species of flowering plant belonging to the family Polygalaceae. It is an annual erect herb seen in grassy areas, open areas in primary and secondary forests and along roads and paths.

== Distribution ==
It is native to Assam, Bangladesh, Borneo, Cambodia, the Caroline Islands, South-Central and Southeast China, East and West Himalaya, India, Java, Laos, the Lesser Sunda Islands, Malaysia, the Maluku Islands, Myanmar, Nepal, New Guinea, the Nicobar Islands, the Philippines, Sulawesi, Sumatra, Thailand, and Vietnam (type).
