= Carpolobia goetzei =

Scientific classification
- Kingdom: Plantae
- Clade: Embryophytes
- Clade: Tracheophytes
- Clade: Spermatophytes
- Clade: Angiosperms
- Clade: Eudicots
- Clade: Rosids
- Order: Fabales
- Family: Polygalaceae
- Genus: Carpolobia
- Species: C. goetzei

Binomial name
- Carpolobia goetzei Gürke

Species of flowering plant

Carpolobia goetzei (also known as Carpolobia goetzii) is a plant species in the milkwort family (Polygalaceae). It is endemic to forested areas, wooded steppes, and areas with alluvial soil with altitudes below 1,400 metres (4,600 ft) in Tropical East Africa between South Sudan and Mozambique, as well as northern Madagascar.

It is a shrub or small tree which has an average height in the range between 1 and 5 metres (3.3 and 16.4 ft). It starts out pubescent, before losing its hairs and becoming glabrous. The leaves the plant produces are mostly 3 to 11 centimetres (1.2 to 4.3 in) long and 1 to 4 centimetres (0.39 to 1.57 in), though some forms exist with short leaves. They are petiolate with stems 1.5 to 3 millimetres (0.059 to 0.118 in) long. The leaves have been described as stiff and leathery and they end in a pointed tip. The flowers the plant produces are white, cream, or yellow and pinkish-brown after fertilization with purple, red, or bright pink honey guides on their tips. It contains 5 petals which are 8 to 15 millimetres (0.31 to 0.59 in) long. The flowers are sometimes scented.

The plant produces a sweet, fleshy, edible fruit which is about 1 centimetre (0.39 in) across. It is eaten raw and collected between April and June. The fruit starts as lime green before turning yellow. When it is ripe, it is orange and very shiny. The fruits are not marketed commercially or cultivated by the local people but are well-liked by chimpanzees. It was first written about in 1900 in the Botanische Jahrbücher für Systematik, Pflanzengeschichte und Pflanzengeographie by Robert Gürke.
