= Moutabea pacifica =

Scientific classification
- Kingdom: Plantae
- Clade: Tracheophytes
- Clade: Angiosperms
- Clade: Eudicots
- Clade: Rosids
- Order: Fabales
- Family: Polygalaceae
- Genus: Moutabea
- Species: M. pacifica

Binomial name
- Moutabea pacifica (Morat & Meijden) Byng & Christenh.

Species of flowering plant

Moutabea pacifica, synonym Balgoya pacifica, is a species of vine in the family Polygalaceae. It is endemic to New Caledonia. It has been considered to be the only species of the genus Balgoya. It is now placed in the neotropical genus Moutabea, in the tribe Moutabeae.
