= Heterosamara =

Scientific classification
- Kingdom: Plantae
- Clade: Tracheophytes
- Clade: Angiosperms
- Clade: Eudicots
- Clade: Rosids
- Order: Fabales
- Family: Polygalaceae
- Genus: Heterosamara; Kuntze

Genus of plants

Heterosamara is a genus of flowering plants belonging to the family Polygalaceae. Its native range is Guinea, Western Central Tropical Africa, and Southern Africa.

== Species ==
Five species are accepted.

- Heterosamara bennae (Jacq.-Fél.) Paiva
- Heterosamara cabrae (Chodat) Paiva
- Heterosamara carrissoana (Exell & Mendonça) Paiva
- Heterosamara galpinii (Hook.f.) Paiva
- Heterosamara mannii (Oliv.) Paiva
