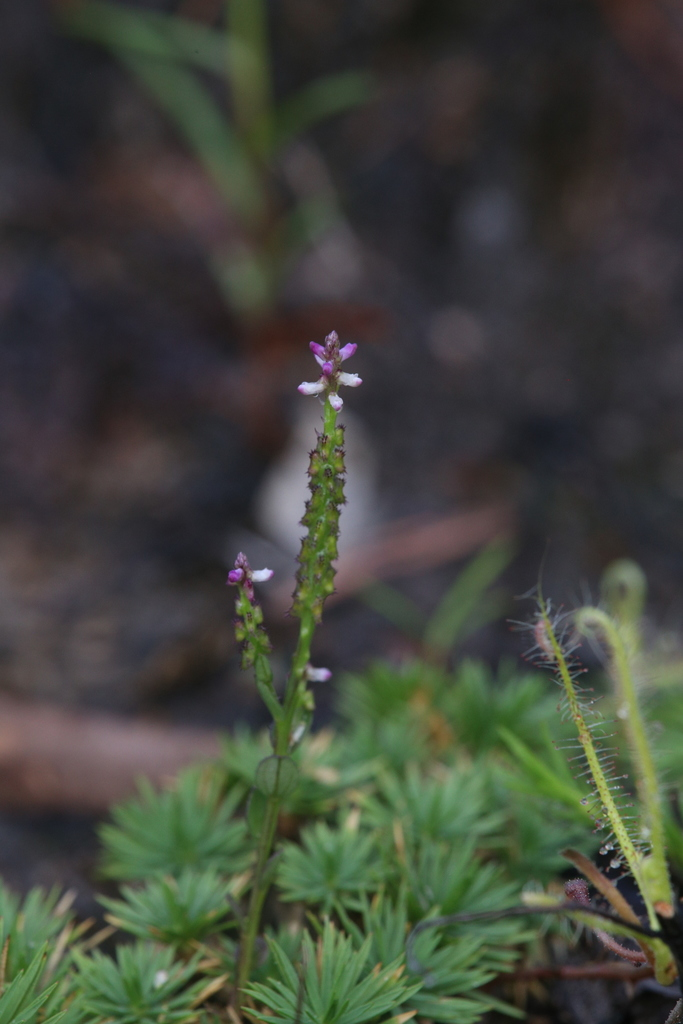

Scientific classification
- Kingdom: Plantae
- Clade: Tracheophytes
- Clade: Angiosperms
- Clade: Eudicots
- Clade: Rosids
- Order: Fabales
- Family: Polygalaceae
- Tribe: Polygaleae
- Genus: Salomonia; Lour.

Type species
- Salomonia cantoniensis Lour.

Synonyms
- Salmonea Vahl

= Salomonia (plant) =

Genus of flowering plants

Salomonia is a genus of plants in the milkwort family, Polygalaceae. It includes five species native to the Indian Subcontinent, Indochina, southern China, Korea, Japan, Malesia, Micronesia, Papuasia, and Queensland. They are annual herbs with erect or ascending stems, aromatic roots, simple alternate leaves and axillary, terminal spike inflorescence.

== Species ==
Five species are accepted:

- Salomonia cantoniensis Lour.
- Salomonia ciliata (L.) DC.
- Salomonia kradungensis H.Koyama
- Salomonia longiciliata Kurz
- Salomonia thailandica H.Koyama
