= Eriandra =

Scientific classification
- Kingdom: Plantae
- Clade: Tracheophytes
- Clade: Angiosperms
- Clade: Eudicots
- Clade: Rosids
- Order: Fabales
- Family: Polygalaceae
- Genus: Eriandra; P.Royen & Steenis (1952)
- Species: E. fragrans

Binomial name
- Eriandra fragrans P.Royen & Steenis (1952)

Genus of plants

Eriandra fragrans is a species of flowering plant belonging to the family Polygalaceae. It is the sole species in genus Eriandra. It is a tree native to New Guinea and the Solomon Islands.
