= Barnhartia =

Scientific classification
- Kingdom: Plantae
- Clade: Tracheophytes
- Clade: Angiosperms
- Clade: Eudicots
- Clade: Rosids
- Order: Fabales
- Family: Polygalaceae
- Genus: Barnhartia; Gleason
- Species: B. floribunda

Binomial name
- Barnhartia floribunda Gleason

Genus of flowering plants

Barnhartia floribunda is a species of flowering plant belonging to the family Polygalaceae. It is the sole species in its genus, Barnhartia. It is native to Venezuela, the Guianas, and Northern Brazil.
