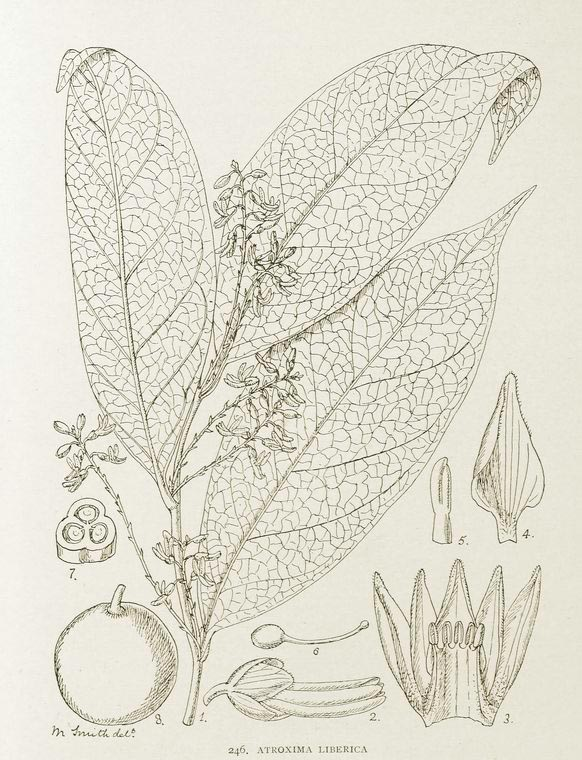
- Botanical drawing of Atroxima liberica

Scientific classification
- Kingdom: Plantae
- Clade: Embryophytes
- Clade: Tracheophytes
- Clade: Spermatophytes
- Clade: Angiosperms
- Clade: Eudicots
- Clade: Rosids
- Order: Fabales
- Family: Polygalaceae
- Tribe: Carpolobieae
- Genus: Atroxima; Stapf

= Atroxima =

Genus of flowering plants

Atroxima is a plant genus in the milkwort family (Polygalaceae). It includes two species native to western and west-central tropical Africa, ranging from Guinea-Bissau to northern Angola. It was first described in 1905 by Otto Stapf in the Journal of the Linnean Society. It was initially in the Polygalaeae tribe before being split off with Carpolobia in 1992 to form the Carpolobieae tribe. They are lianas or liana-like shrubs which produce shiny, orange, fleshy uni- to tri-locular berries, these can have an area of up to 5 by 5 by 4 centimetres (2.0 in × 2.0 in × 1.6 in).

== Species ==
As of November 2025, two species are accepted:

- Atroxima afzeliana (Oliv. ex Chodat) Stapf
- Atroxima liberica Stapf
