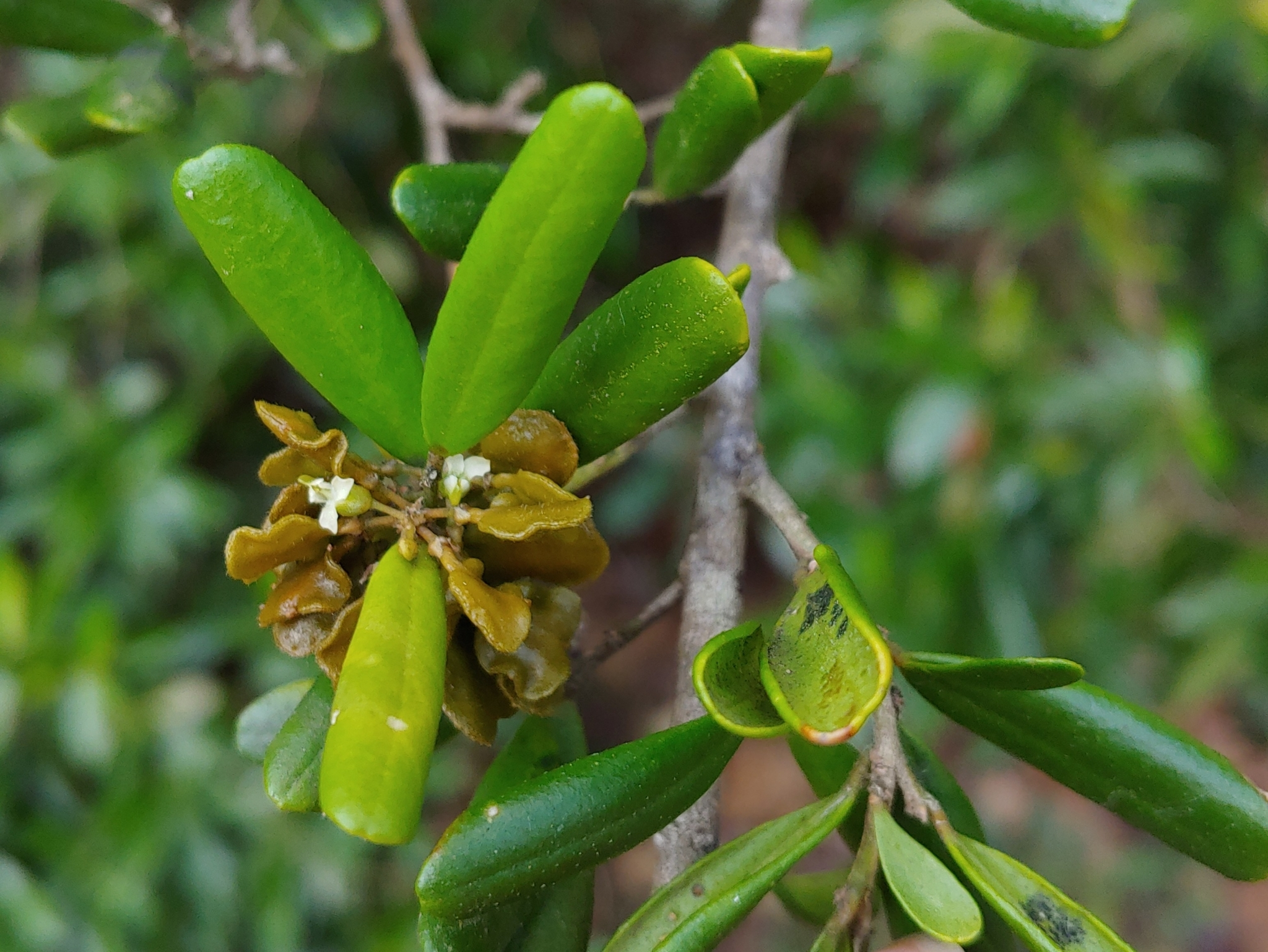
- Badiera penaea in Puerto Rico

Scientific classification
- Kingdom: Plantae
- Clade: Embryophytes
- Clade: Tracheophytes
- Clade: Spermatophytes
- Clade: Angiosperms
- Clade: Eudicots
- Clade: Rosids
- Order: Fabales
- Family: Polygalaceae
- Genus: Badiera; DC.

= Badiera =

Genus of flowering plants

Badiera is a genus of flowering plants belonging to the family Polygalaceae. Its native range is the Caribbean.

== Species ==
Seven species are accepted.

- Badiera cubensis Britton
- Badiera fuertesii Urb.
- Badiera oblongata Britton
- Badiera penaea (L.) DC.
- Badiera propinqua Britton
- Badiera subrhombifolia J.R.Abbott
- Badiera virgata Britton
