= Epirixanthes =

Scientific classification
- Kingdom: Plantae
- Clade: Tracheophytes
- Clade: Angiosperms
- Clade: Eudicots
- Clade: Rosids
- Order: Fabales
- Family: Polygalaceae
- Genus: Epirixanthes; Blume

Synonyms
- Epirizanthe Blume

Genus of plants

Epirixanthes is a genus of flowering plants belonging to the family Polygalaceae. It includes seven species which range from India and southern China through Indochina and Malesia to New Guinea.

== Species ==
Seven species are accepted.

- Epirixanthes compressa Pendry
- Epirixanthes confusa Tsukaya, Suleiman & H.Okada
- Epirixanthes cylindrica Blume
- Epirixanthes elongata Blume
- Epirixanthes kinabaluensis T.Wendt
- Epirixanthes pallida T.Wendt
- Epirixanthes papuana J.J.Sm.
