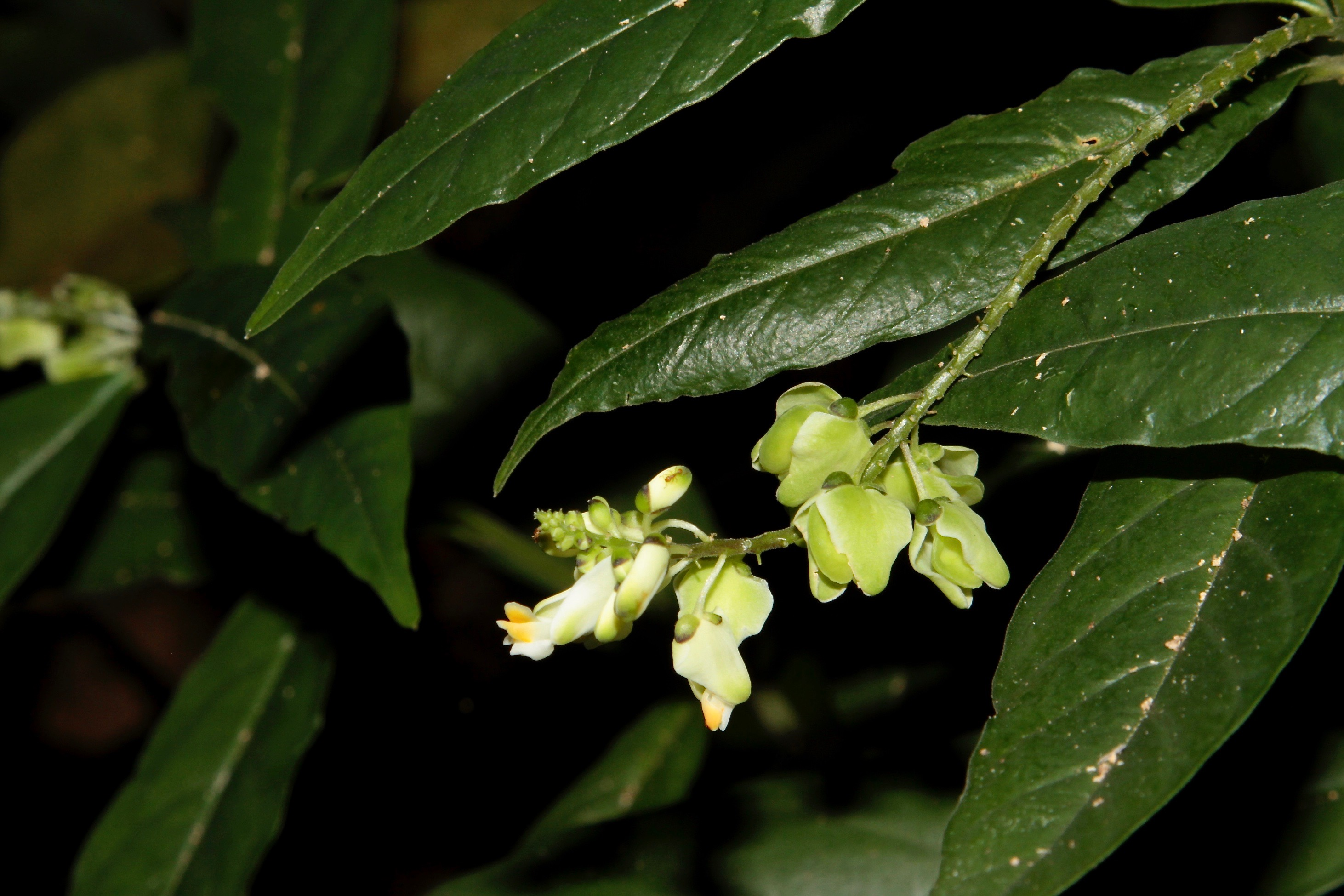
- Caamembeca laureola (now Caamembeca salicifolia)

Scientific classification
- Kingdom: Plantae
- Clade: Embryophytes
- Clade: Tracheophytes
- Clade: Spermatophytes
- Clade: Angiosperms
- Clade: Eudicots
- Clade: Rosids
- Order: Fabales
- Family: Polygalaceae
- Genus: Caamembeca; J.F.B.Pastore

= Caamembeca =

Genus of flowering plants

Caamembeca is a genus of flowering plants belonging to the family Polygalaceae. Its native range is tropical South America.

== Species ==
13 species are accepted.

- Caamembeca amazonensis (Marques & E.F.Guim.) J.F.B.Pastore
- Caamembeca andina (A.W.Benn.) J.F.B.Pastore & Mabb.
- Caamembeca autranii (Chodat) J.F.B.Pastore
- Caamembeca gigantea (Chodat) J.F.B.Pastore
- Caamembeca grandifolia (A.St.-Hil. & Moq.) J.F.B.Pastore
- Caamembeca insignis (Klotzsch ex Chodat) J.F.B.Pastore
- Caamembeca martinellii (Marques & E.F.Guim.) J.F.B.Pastore
- Caamembeca oleifolia (A.St.-Hil. & Moq.) J.F.B.Pastore
- Caamembeca oxyphylla (DC.) J.F.B.Pastore
- Caamembeca salicifolia (Poir.) J.F.B.Pastore
- Caamembeca spectabilis (DC.) J.F.B.Pastore
- Caamembeca ulei (Taub.) J.F.B.Pastore
- Caamembeca warmingiana (A.W.Benn.) J.F.B.Pastore
