= Gymnospora =

Scientific classification
- Kingdom: Plantae
- Clade: Embryophytes
- Clade: Tracheophytes
- Clade: Spermatophytes
- Clade: Angiosperms
- Clade: Eudicots
- Clade: Rosids
- Order: Fabales
- Family: Polygalaceae
- Tribe: Polygaleae
- Genus: Gymnospora (Chodat) J.F.B. Pastore

Synonyms
- Polygala sect. Gymnospora Chodat

Genus of flowering plants

Gymnospora is a genus of flowering plants in the milkwort family (Polygalaceae) which is endemic to Brazil. It was first described as a subgenus of Polygala by Robert Chodat in 1891. It was separated into its own genera in 2013. Their flowers are 6 to 10 millimetres (0.24 to 0.39 in) long and its pedicels are 2 to 8 millimetres (0.079 to 0.315 in) long.

== Species ==
As of November 2025, there are 2 accepted species:

- Gymnospora blanchetti (Chodat) J.F.B.Pastore
- Gymnospora violoides (A.St.-Hil. & Moq.) J.F.B.Pastore
