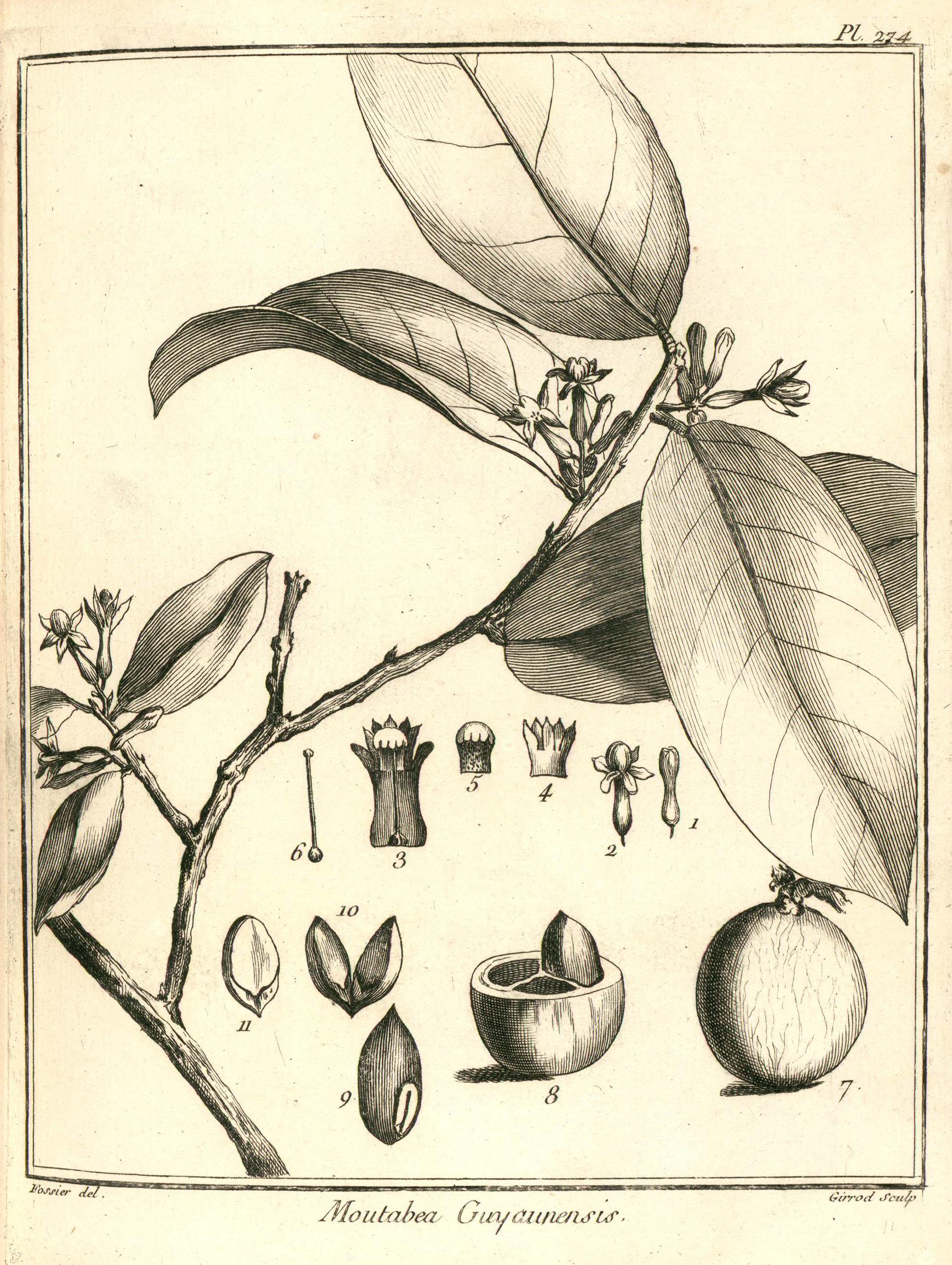
- Moutabea guianensis

Scientific classification
- Kingdom: Plantae
- Clade: Tracheophytes
- Clade: Angiosperms
- Clade: Eudicots
- Clade: Rosids
- Order: Fabales
- Family: Polygalaceae
- Tribe: Moutabeae
- Genus: Moutabea; Aubl. (1775)

Synonyms
- Acosta Ruiz & Pav. (1794), nom. illeg.; Balgoya Morat & Meijden (1991); Cryptostomum Schreb. (1789)

= Moutabea =

Genus of flowering plants

Moutabea is a genus of flowering plants in the family Polygalaceae with 11 species. It was first described in 1775 by Jean Aublet. Most species are neotropical, ranging from Costa Rica to Bolivia and central Brazil, with one species, M. pacifica, native to New Caledonia.

== Description ==
Moutabea are erect or scandent trees, shrubs, and lianas. Its leaves are alternate, petiolate, and usually glabrous. Its zygomorphic flowers are white or yellow and contain 5 petals which are subequal and 5 sepals which are equal. Its 8 stamens are joined into 2 groups of 4. Its ovary is usually 4-locular, though it can be 2- to 5-locular. The berry it produces is edible, globose, and indehiscent. They contain 2 to 5 seeds.

== Species ==
As of April 2024, Plants of the World Online accepted the following species:

- Moutabea aculeata (Ruiz & Pav.) Poepp. & Endl.
- Moutabea angustifolia Huber
- Moutabea arianae Jans.-Jac. & Maas
- Moutabea chartacea Aymard & L.M.Campb.
- Moutabea chodatiana Huber
- Moutabea excoriata Mart. ex Miq.
- Moutabea floribunda J.C.Huber ex J.B.Silveira & Secco
- Moutabea gentryi T.Wendt
- Moutabea guianensis Aubl.
- Moutabea pacifica (Morat & Meijden) Byng & Christenh. – formerly placed in the monotypic genus Balgoya
- Moutabea victoriana J.B.Silveira & Secco
