= Monrosia =

Scientific classification
- Kingdom: Plantae
- Clade: Tracheophytes
- Clade: Angiosperms
- Clade: Eudicots
- Clade: Rosids
- Order: Fabales
- Family: Polygalaceae
- Genus: Monrosia; Grondona

species
- Monrosia pterolopha (Chodat) Grondona; Monrosia sanjuanensis Agust.Martinez & J.F.B.Pastore

Genus of flowering plants

Monrosia is a genus of flowering plants belonging to the family Polygalaceae. It includes two species native to northwestern Argentina:

- Monrosia pterolopha (Chodat) Grondona
- Monrosia sanjuanensis Agust.Martinez & J.F.B.Pastore

The genus was first described in 1949 by Eduardo M. Grondona to contain a single species, Monrosia pterolopha. A second species, M. sanjuanensis, was described in 2020.
