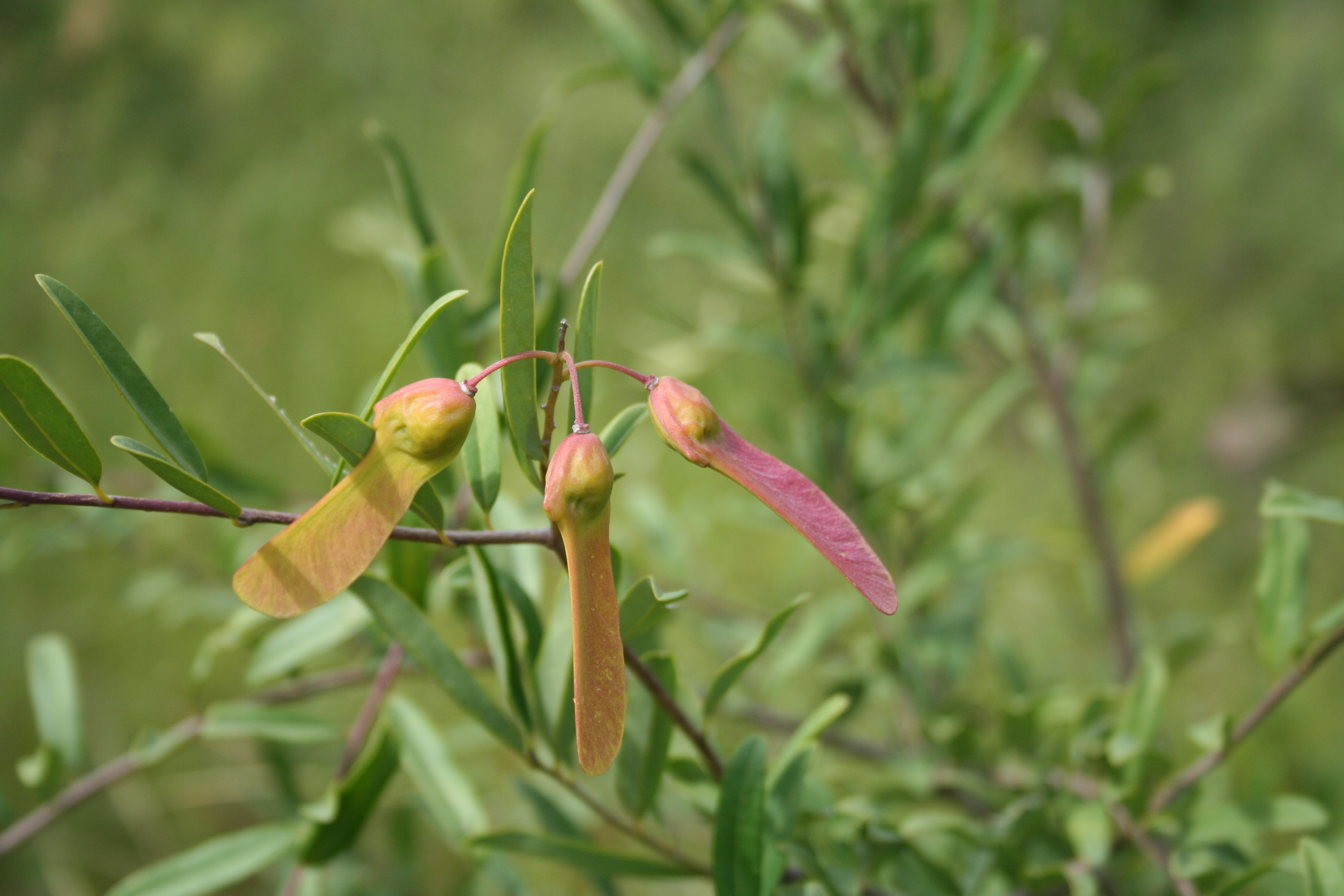
- S. longipedunculata

Scientific classification
- Kingdom: Plantae
- Clade: Tracheophytes
- Clade: Angiosperms
- Clade: Eudicots
- Clade: Rosids
- Order: Fabales
- Family: Polygalaceae
- Tribe: Polygaleae
- Genus: Securidaca; L.

Synonyms
- Badiera Hassk.; Corytholobium Mart. ex Benth.; Elsota Adans.; Lophostylis Hochst.; Rodschiedia Miq.

= Securidaca =

Family of shrubs

Securidaca is a genus of shrubs and lianas in the family Polygalaceae. It is native to tropical Africa, SE Asia and the Americas from Mexico and the West Indies to Paraguay.

== Species ==
59 species are accepted.

- Securidaca acuminata A.St.-Hil. & Moq.
- Securidaca amazonica Chodat
- Securidaca aquae-nigrae Aymard
- Securidaca atroviolacea Elmer
- Securidaca bialata Benth.
- Securidaca brownii Griseb.
- Securidaca cacumina Wurdack
- Securidaca calophylla (Poepp.) S.F. Blake
- Securidaca cayennensis S.F. Blake
- Securidaca coriacea Bonpl.
- Securidaca divaricata Nees & Mart.
- Securidaca diversifolia (L.) S.F.Blake
- Securidaca dolod B.Walln.
- Securidaca ecristata Kassau
- Securidaca elliptica Turcz.
- Securidaca falcata Chodat
- Securidaca fragilis B.Ståhl & B.Eriksen
- Securidaca froesii Wurdack
- Securidaca fruticans Wurdack
- Securidaca fundacionensis Aymard & L.M.Campb.
- Securidaca goudotiana Triana & Planch.
- Securidaca inappendiculata Hassk.
- Securidaca lanceolata A.St.-Hil. & Moq.
- Securidaca lateralis A.W.Benn
- Securidaca leiocarpa S.F.Blake
- Securidaca longepedunculata Fresen.
- Securidaca longifolia Poepp.
- Securidaca lophosoma (S.F.Blake) Cheesman
- Securidaca macrocarpa A.W. Benn.
- Securidaca maguirei Wurdack
- Securidaca marajoara C.S.Costa, A.C.A.Aguiar & A.O.Simões
- Securidaca marginata Benth.
- Securidaca micheliana Chodat
- Securidaca ovalifolia A.St.-Hil.
- Securidaca paniculata Rich.
- Securidaca pendula Bonpl.
- Securidaca philippinensis Chodat
- Securidaca planchoniana Killip & Dugand
- Securidaca prancei Wurdack
- Securidaca pubescens DC.
- Securidaca pubiflora Benth.
- Securidaca purpurea Linden & Planch.
- Securidaca pyramidalis Sprague ex Sandwith
- Securidaca retusa Benth.
- Securidaca revoluta (A.W.Benn.) Marques
- Securidaca savannarum Wurdack
- Securidaca scandens Jacq.
- Securidaca schlimii Planch. & Linden
- Securidaca speciosa Wurdack
- Securidaca spinifex Sandwith
- Securidaca sylvestris Schltdl.
- Securidaca tenuifolia Chodat
- Securidaca tomentosa A.St.-Hil. & Moq.
- Securidaca trianae Killip & Dugand
- Securidaca uniflora Oort
- Securidaca virgata Sw.
- Securidaca warmingiana Chodat
- Securidaca welwitschii Oliv.
- Securidaca yaoshanensis K.S.Hao
