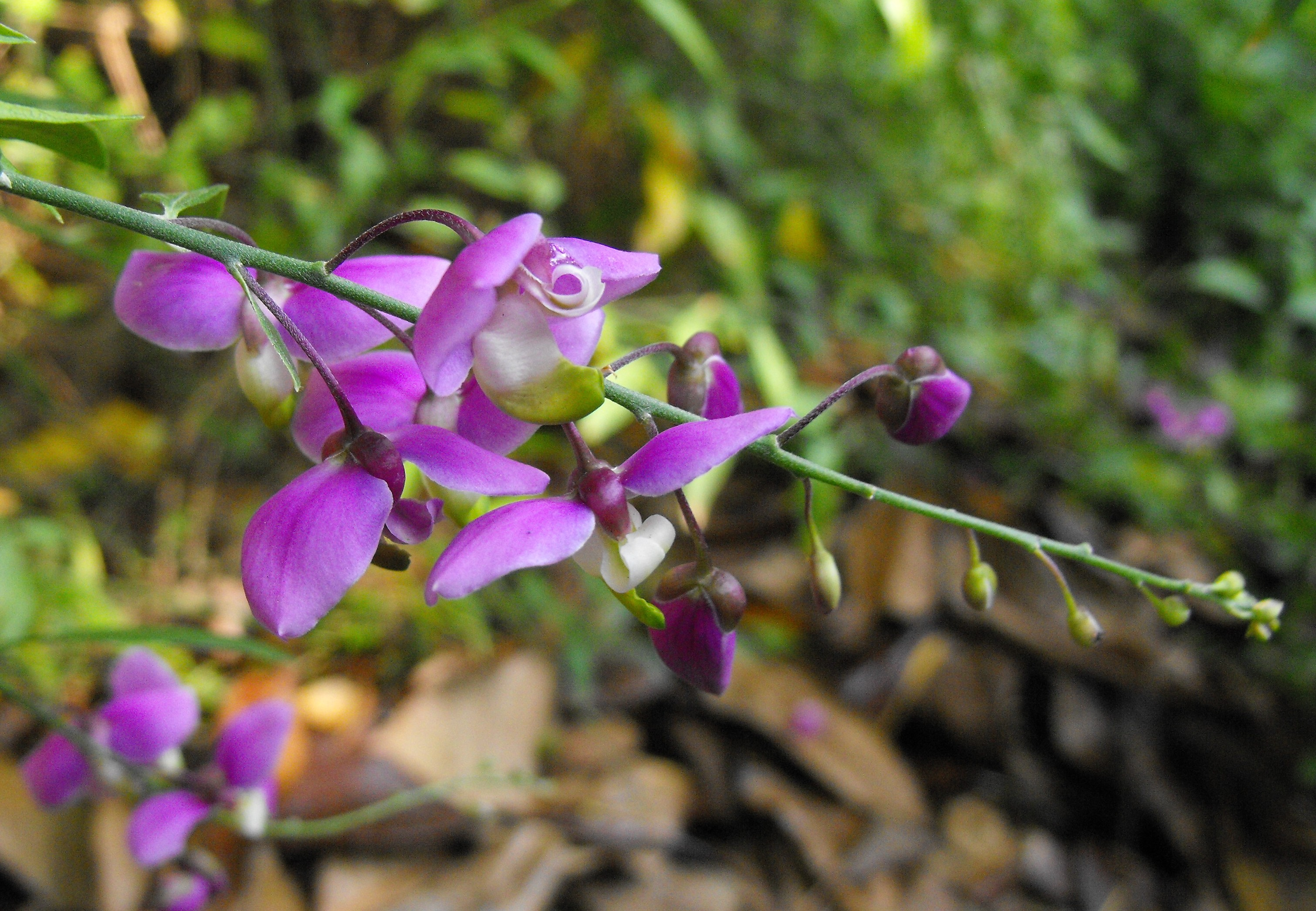
- Asemeia apopetala

Scientific classification
- Kingdom: Plantae
- Clade: Tracheophytes
- Clade: Angiosperms
- Clade: Eudicots
- Clade: Rosids
- Order: Fabales
- Family: Polygalaceae
- Genus: Asemeia; Raf.

Species
- See text.

= Asemeia (plant) =

Genus of flowering plants

Asemeia is a genus of flowering plants belonging to the family Polygalaceae. It includes 36 species native to the tropical and subtropical Americas, ranging from the southeastern United States through Mexico, Central America, the Caribbean, and tropical South America to northern Argentina.

== Species ==
As of April 2024, Plants of the World Online accepts the following species:

- Asemeia acuminata (Willd.) J.F.B.Pastore & J.R.Abbott
- Asemeia aguiariana J.F.B.Pastore & M.Mota
- Asemeia apopetala (Brandegee) J.F.B.Pastore & J.R.Abbott
- Asemeia campestris J.F.B.Pastore & M.Mota
- Asemeia coracoralinae M.Mota & J.F.B.Pastore
- Asemeia echinosperma (Görts) J.F.B.Pastore & J.R.Abbott
- Asemeia eglandulosa J.F.B.Pastore & M.Mota
- Asemeia extraaxillaris (Chodat) J.F.B.Pastore & J.R.Abbott
- Asemeia floribunda (Benth.) J.F.B.Pastore & J.R.Abbott
- Asemeia galmeri (Chodat) J.F.B.Pastore & J.R.Abbott
- Asemeia glabra (A.W.Benn.) J.F.B.Pastore & J.R.Abbott
- Asemeia grandiflora (Walter) Small
- Asemeia hebeclada (DC.) J.F.B.Pastore & J.R.Abbott
- Asemeia hirsuta (A.St.-Hil. & Moq.) J.F.B.Pastore & J.R.Abbott
- Asemeia hondurana (Chodat) J.F.B.Pastore & J.R.Abbott
- Asemeia ignatii (Chodat) J.F.B.Pastore & J.R.Abbott
- Asemeia ilheotica (Wawra) J.F.B.Pastore & J.R.Abbott
- Asemeia lindmaniana (Chodat) J.F.B.Pastore & J.R.Abbott
- Asemeia marquesiana (J.F.B.Pastore & T.B.Cavalc.) J.F.B.Pastore & J.R.Abbott
- Asemeia martiana (A.W.Benn.) J.F.B.Pastore & J.R.Abbott
- Asemeia minensis M.Mota & J.F.B.Pastore
- Asemeia mollis (Kunth) J.F.B.Pastore & J.R.Abbott
- Asemeia monninoides (Kunth) J.F.B.Pastore & J.R.Abbott
- Asemeia monticola (Kunth) J.F.B.Pastore & J.R.Abbott
- Asemeia nana M.Mota & J.F.B.Pastore
- Asemeia ovata (Poir.) J.F.B.Pastore & J.R.Abbott
- Asemeia parietaria (Chodat) J.F.B.Pastore & J.R.Abbott
- Asemeia pohliana (A.St.-Hil. & Moq.) J.F.B.Pastore & J.R.Abbott
- Asemeia pseudohebeclada (Chodat) J.F.B.Pastore & J.R.Abbott
- Asemeia rhodoptera (Mart. ex A.W.Benn.) J.F.B.Pastore & J.R.Abbott
- Asemeia securidaca (Chodat) J.F.B.Pastore & J.R.Abbott
- Asemeia sphaerospora (Chodat) J.F.B.Pastore & J.R.Abbott
- Asemeia subaphylla J.F.B.Pastore & M.Mota
- Asemeia tobatiensis (Chodat) J.F.B.Pastore & J.R.Abbott
- Asemeia tonsa (S.F.Blake) J.F.B.Pastore & J.R.Abbott
- Asemeia violacea (Aubl.) J.F.B.Pastore & J.R.Abbott
