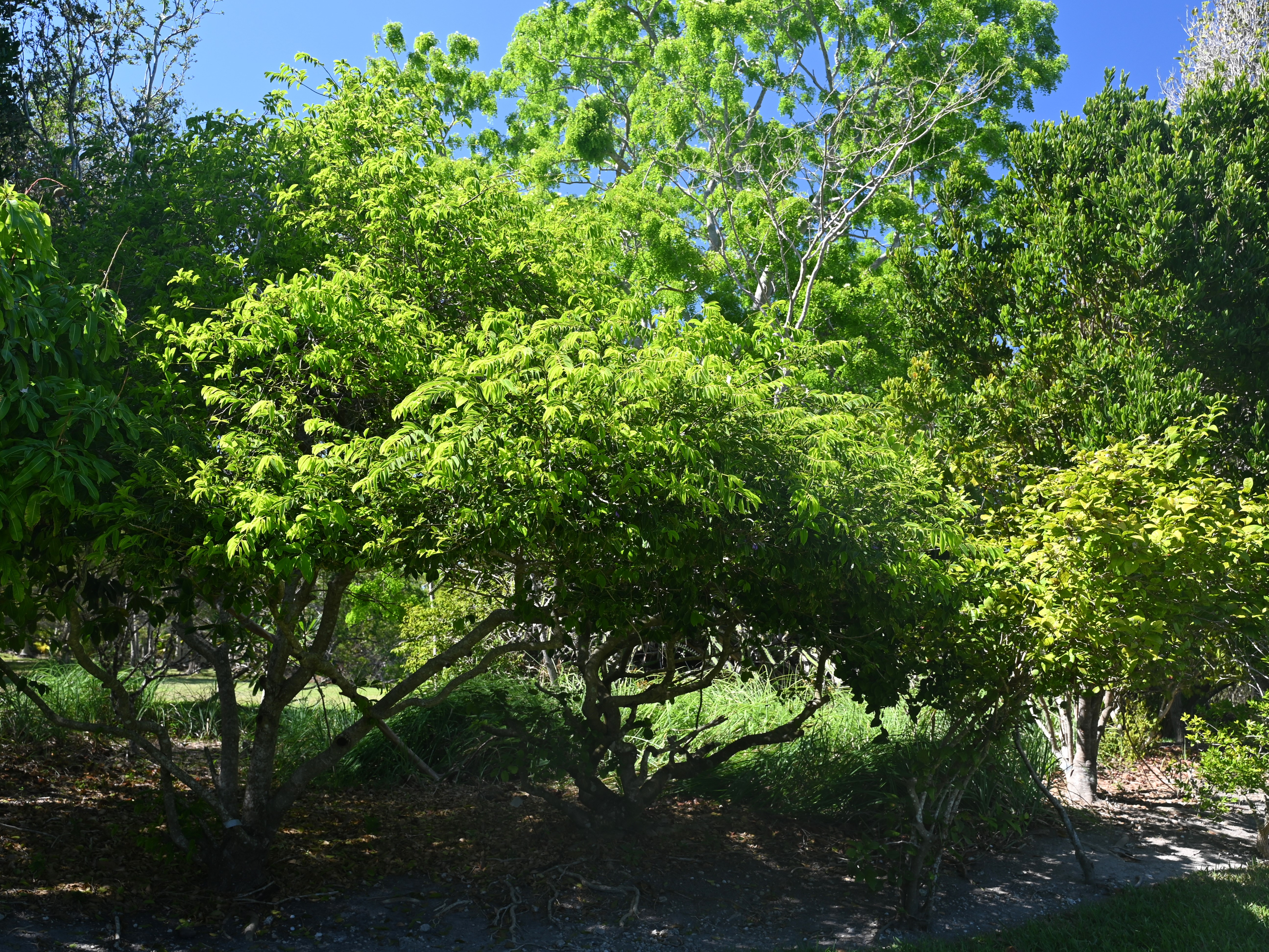
- At the Fairchild Tropical Botanic Garden

Conservation status
- Near Threatened (IUCN 3.1)

Scientific classification
- Kingdom: Plantae
- Clade: Tracheophytes
- Clade: Angiosperms
- Clade: Eudicots
- Clade: Rosids
- Order: Fabales
- Family: Polygalaceae
- Genus: Phlebotaenia
- Species: P. cowellii

Binomial name
- Phlebotaenia cowellii Britton

Synonyms
- Phlebotaenia portoricensis Urb.; Polygala cowellii (Britton) S.F.Blake

= Phlebotaenia cowellii =

Species of plant

Phlebotaenia cowellii, the violet tree, is a species of flowering plant in the family Polygalaceae, native to Puerto Rico. A small tree reaching 20 m (66 ft), it is typically found in both seasonally dry forests and humid forests at elevations from 5 to 600 m (16 to 2,000 ft). Its fruits have asymmetrical winged fins. Found on limestone, its sporadic distribution and continuing encroachment on its forest habitat has led to it being assessed as Near Threatened.
