= Bredemeyera =

Scientific classification
- Kingdom: Plantae
- Clade: Tracheophytes
- Clade: Angiosperms
- Clade: Eudicots
- Clade: Rosids
- Order: Fabales
- Family: Polygalaceae
- Genus: Bredemeyera; Willd. (1801)

Synonyms
- Catocoma Benth. (1841)

Genus of flowering plants

Bredemeyera is a genus of flowering plants belonging to the family Polygalaceae. It includes 19 species native to the tropical Americas, ranging from southern Mexico through Central and South America to Paraguay and southern Brazil.

== Species ==
19 species are accepted.

- Bredemeyera atlantica M.Mota & J.F.B.Pastore
- Bredemeyera barbeyana Chodat
- Bredemeyera bracteata Klotzsch ex Hassk.
- Bredemeyera brevifolia (Benth.) Klotzsch ex A.W.Benn.
- Bredemeyera confusa Chodat
- Bredemeyera cuneata Klotzsch ex Hassk.
- Bredemeyera densiflora A.W.Benn.
- Bredemeyera disperma (Vell.) J.F.B.Pastore
- Bredemeyera divaricata (DC.) J.F.B.Pastore
- Bredemeyera ericifolia M.Mota & J.F.B.Pastore
- Bredemeyera floribunda Willd.
- Bredemeyera hebeclada (DC.) J.F.B.Pastore
- Bredemeyera isabelliana Barb.Rodr.
- Bredemeyera laurifolia (A.St.-Hil. & Moq.) Klotzsch ex A.W.Benn.
- Bredemeyera lucida (Benth.) Klotzsch ex Hassk.
- Bredemeyera martiana A.W.Benn.
- Bredemeyera moritziana Klotzsch ex Hassk.
- Bredemeyera myrtifolia A.W.Benn.
- Bredemeyera petiolata M.Mota & J.F.B.Pastore
