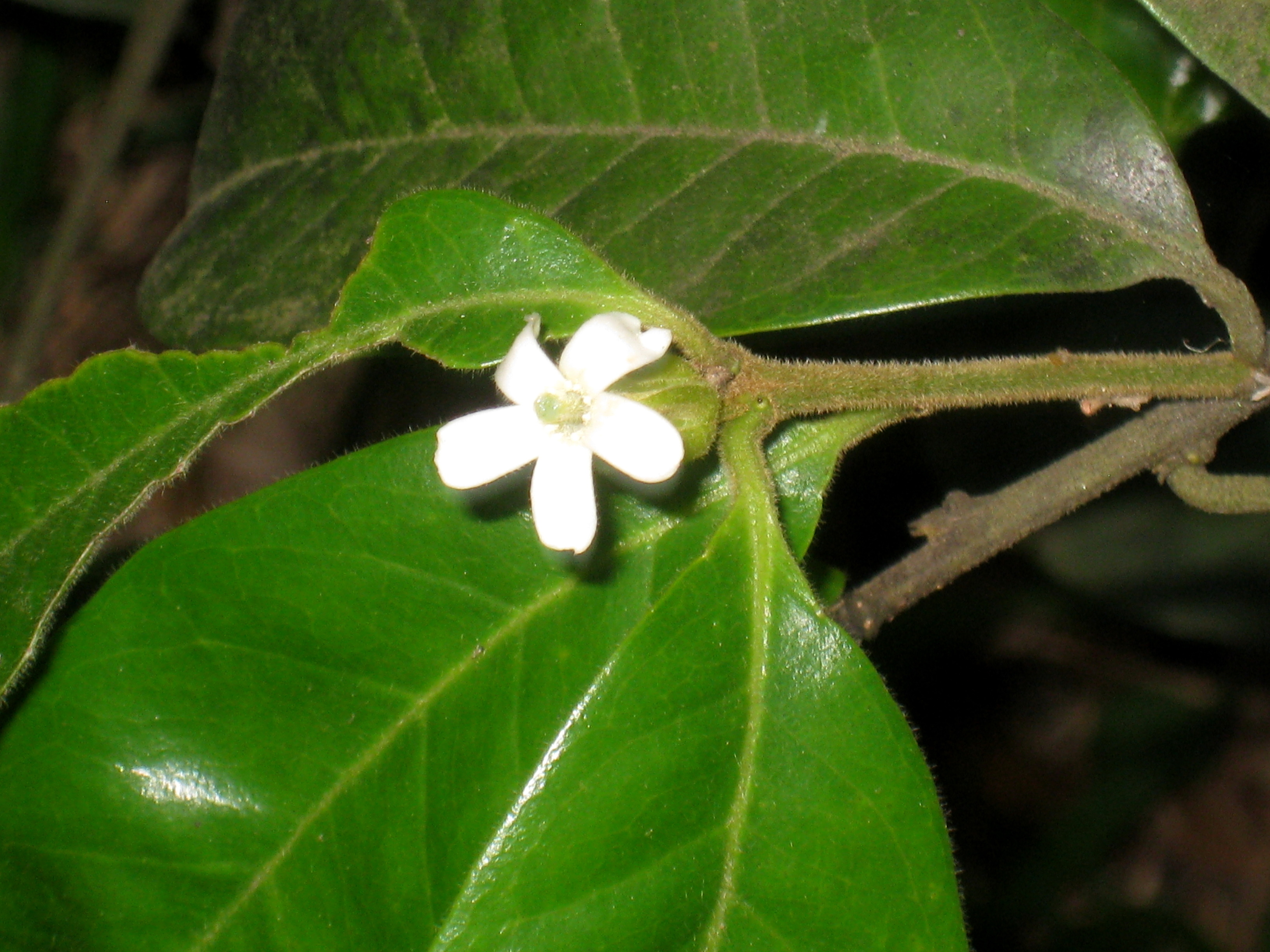
- Diclidanthera elliptica

Scientific classification
- Kingdom: Plantae
- Clade: Embryophytes
- Clade: Tracheophytes
- Clade: Spermatophytes
- Clade: Angiosperms
- Clade: Eudicots
- Clade: Rosids
- Order: Fabales
- Family: Polygalaceae
- Genus: Diclidanthera; Mart.

Synonyms
- Pluchia Vell.

= Diclidanthera =

Genus of plants

Diclidanthera is a genus of flowering plants belonging to the family Polygalaceae. Its native range is Venezuela to Brazil, northern Peru, and Bolivia.

== Species ==
Six species are accepted.

- Diclidanthera bolivarensis Pittier
- Diclidanthera elliptica Miers
- Diclidanthera laurifolia Mart.
- Diclidanthera octandra Gleason
- Diclidanthera penduliflora Mart.
- Diclidanthera wurdackiana Aymard & P.E.Berry
