= Rhamphopetalum =

Scientific classification
- Kingdom: Plantae
- Clade: Tracheophytes
- Clade: Angiosperms
- Clade: Eudicots
- Clade: Rosids
- Order: Fabales
- Family: Polygalaceae
- Genus: Rhamphopetalum; J.F.B.Pastore & M.Mota (2019)
- Species: R. microphyllum

Binomial name
- Rhamphopetalum microphyllum (Griseb.) J.F.B.Pastore & M.Mota (2019)

Synonyms
- Acanthocladus microphyllus Griseb. (1879); Bredemeyera fruticulosa Kassau (1931); Bredemeyera microphylla (Griseb.) Hieron. (1881); Bredemeyera microphylla var. adpressa Norverto & R.L.Pérez-Mor. (1990); Polygala chodatiana A.W.Benn. (1895)

Genus of flowering plants

Rhamphopetalum microphyllum is a species of flowering plant in the family Polygalaceae. It is the sole species in genus Rhamphopetalum. It is a subshrub endemic to Argentina.
