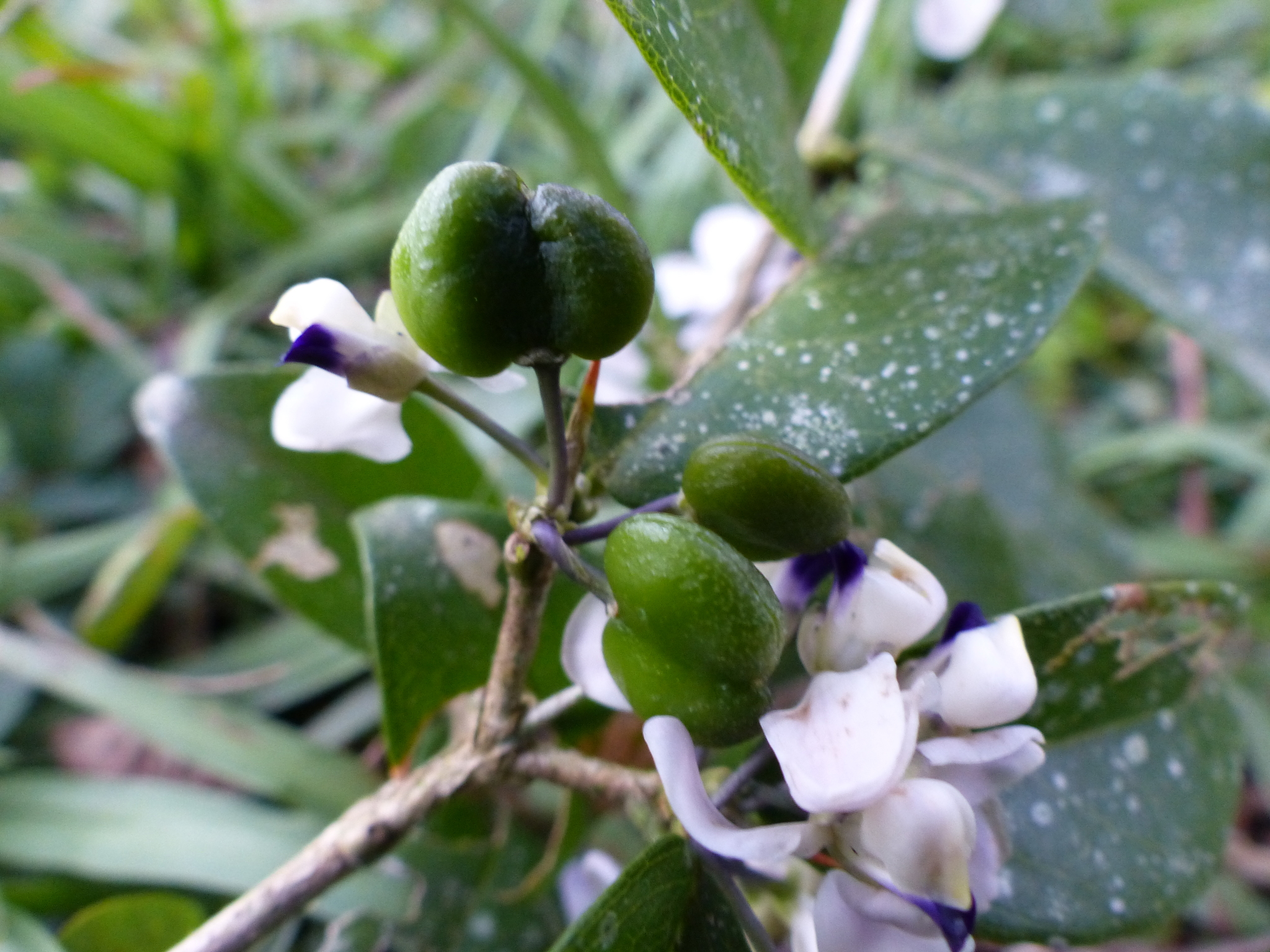
- Acanthocladus dichromus

Scientific classification
- Kingdom: Plantae
- Clade: Embryophytes
- Clade: Tracheophytes
- Clade: Spermatophytes
- Clade: Angiosperms
- Clade: Eudicots
- Clade: Rosids
- Order: Fabales
- Family: Polygalaceae
- Genus: Acanthocladus; Klotzsch ex Hassk.

Species
- See text

= Acanthocladus =

Genus of flowering plants

Acanthocladus is a genus of flowering plants in the family Polygalaceae. Species of the genus are native to South America. Kew Royal Botanical Gardens has photos several species on its website.

== Species ==
The following species are recognised in the genus Acanthocladus:

- Acanthocladus brasiliensis (A.St.-Hil. & Moq.) Klotzsch ex Hassk.
- Acanthocladus colombianus Aymard & J.F.B.Pastore
- Acanthocladus dichromus (Steud.) J.F.B.Pastore
- Acanthocladus dukei (Barringer) J.F.B.Pastore & D.B.O.S.Cardoso
- Acanthocladus guayaquilensis B.Eriksen & B.Ståhl
- Acanthocladus pulcherrimus (Kuhlm.) J.F.B.Pastore & D.B.O.S.Cardoso
- Acanthocladus santosii (Wurdack) J.F.B.Pastore & D.B.O.S.Cardoso
- Acanthocladus scleroxylon (Ducke) B.Eriksen & B.Ståhl
