= Hualania =

Scientific classification
- Kingdom: Plantae
- Clade: Tracheophytes
- Clade: Angiosperms
- Clade: Eudicots
- Clade: Rosids
- Order: Fabales
- Family: Polygalaceae
- Genus: Hualania; Phil.
- Species: H. colletioides

Binomial name
- Hualania colletioides Phil.

Synonyms
- Bredemeyera colletioides (Phil.) Chodat

Genus of plants

Hualania is a monotypic genus of flowering plants belonging to the family Polygalaceae. The sole species is Hualania colletioides, a shrub endemic to northwestern Argentina.
