= Phlebotaenia =

Scientific classification
- Kingdom: Plantae
- Clade: Tracheophytes
- Clade: Angiosperms
- Clade: Eudicots
- Clade: Rosids
- Order: Fabales
- Family: Polygalaceae
- Genus: Phlebotaenia; Griseb.

Genus of plants

Phlebotaenia is a genus of flowering plants belonging to the family Polygalaceae. It includes two species native to Cuba and Puerto Rico.

Species:

- Phlebotaenia cowellii Britton – Puerto Rico
- Phlebotaenia cuneata Griseb. – Cuba
