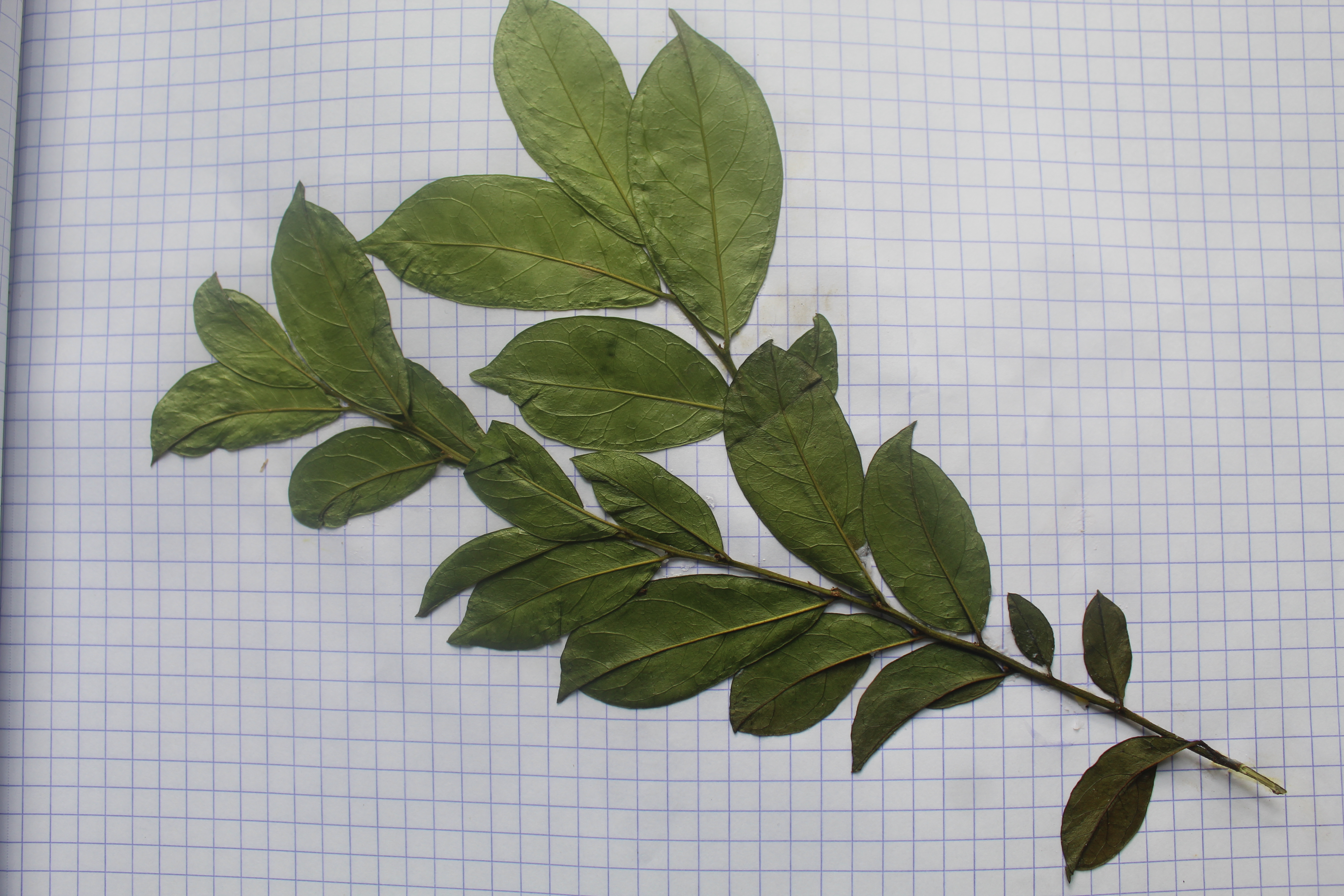

Conservation status
- Least Concern (IUCN 3.1)

Scientific classification
- Kingdom: Plantae
- Clade: Embryophytes
- Clade: Tracheophytes
- Clade: Spermatophytes
- Clade: Angiosperms
- Clade: Eudicots
- Clade: Rosids
- Order: Fabales
- Family: Polygalaceae
- Genus: Carpolobia
- Species: C. alba

Binomial name
- Carpolobia alba G.Don

Synonyms
- Carpolobia delvauxii E.M.A.Petit; Carpolobia glabrescens Hutch. & Dalziel

= Carpolobia alba =

Species of flowering plant

Carpolobia alba is a plant species in the milkwort family (Polygalaceae) that is endemic to rainforests, forest fringes, and savanna-park with altitudes below 400 metres (1,300 ft) in Western Tropical Africa. It is a shrub or small tree which is 3 to 6 metres (9.8 to 19.7 ft) tall. Its branches are puberulous or shortly pubescent. Its leaves are membranous or slightly leathery. The flowers it produces are yellowish white or white with a crimson spot at the base of upper petals. It produces yellow or scarlet-coloured fruit which are edible and usually contain 3 seeds. It was first described by George Don in 1831. It is used traditionally as a medicine against sexual dysfunction.
