= Ancylotropis (plant) =

Scientific classification
- Kingdom: Plantae
- Clade: Tracheophytes
- Clade: Angiosperms
- Clade: Eudicots
- Clade: Rosids
- Order: Fabales
- Family: Polygalaceae
- Genus: Ancylotropis; B.Eriksen

Genus of flowering plants

Ancylotropis is a genus of flowering plants belonging to the family Polygalaceae.

Its native range is Bolivia and Brazil.

Species:

- Ancylotropis insignis (A.W.Benn.) B.Eriksen
- Ancylotropis malmeana (Chodat) B.Eriksen
