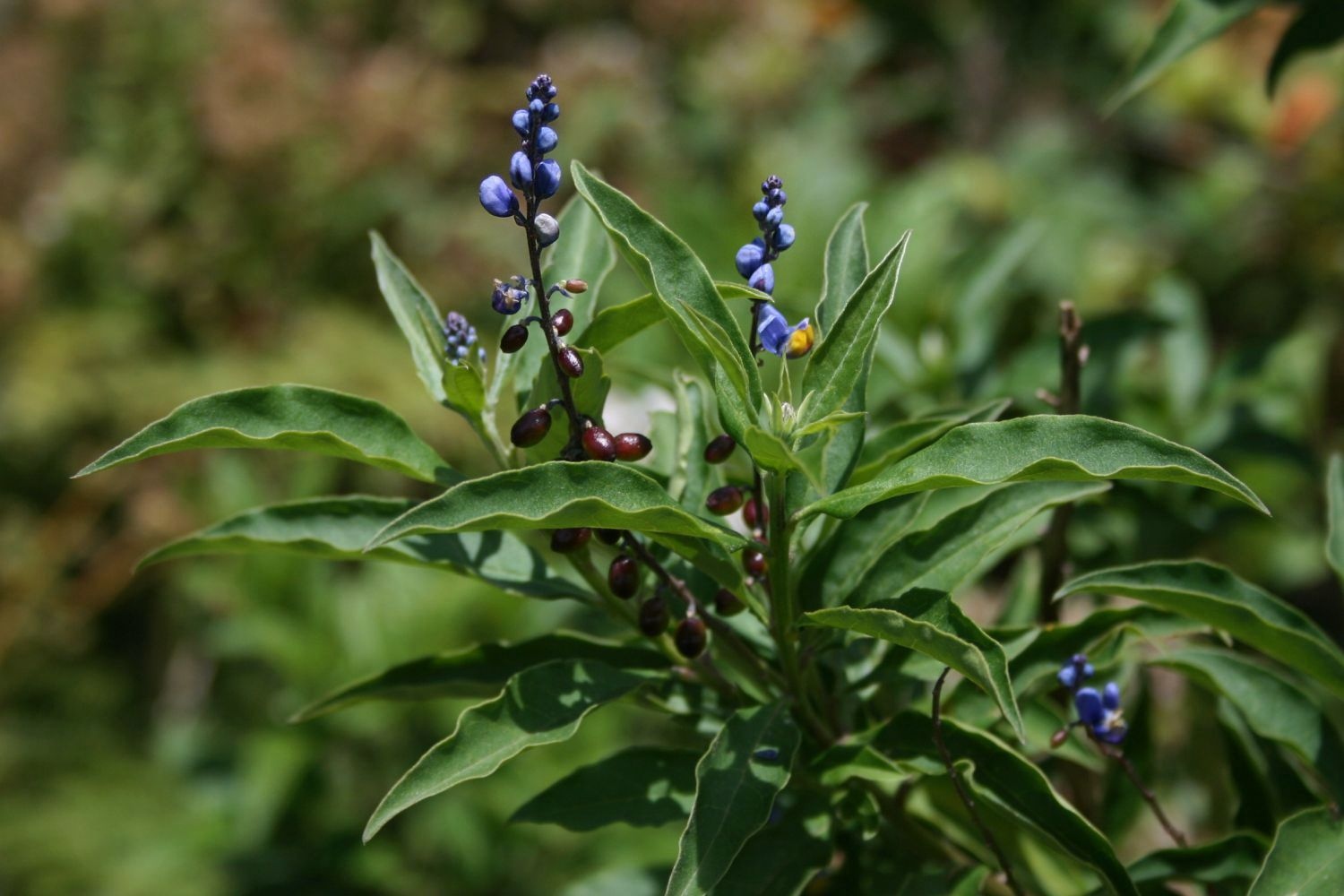
- Monnina xalapensis

Scientific classification
- Kingdom: Plantae
- Clade: Tracheophytes
- Clade: Angiosperms
- Clade: Eudicots
- Clade: Rosids
- Order: Fabales
- Family: Polygalaceae
- Tribe: Polygaleae
- Genus: Monnina; Ruiz & Pav.

Synonyms
- Hebeandra Bonpl.; Pteromonnina (DC.) B.Eriksen

= Monnina =

Genus of flowering plants

Monnina is a genus of flowering plants in the family Polygalaceae. There are 150 to 200 species distributed throughout the Americas from the United States to Patagonia. It was named after José Moñino, 1st Count of Floridablanca.

== Species ==
168 species are accepted.

- Monnina acuminata Ferreyra
- Monnina acutifolia Chodat
- Monnina aestuans (L.f.) DC.
- Monnina alatodrupacea Kuntze
- Monnina alinae B.Eriksen
- Monnina amarella Chodat
- Monnina amplibracteata Ferreyra
- Monnina andina Chodat
- Monnina arbuscula Chodat
- Monnina arbutus Chodat
- Monnina autraniana Chodat
- Monnina bifurcata Moc. & Sessé ex DC.
- Monnina boliviana Chodat
- Monnina boliviensis A.W.Benn.
- Monnina bonplandiana B.Eriksen
- Monnina bracteata Chodat
- Monnina bridgesii Chodat
- Monnina buchtienii Rusby
- Monnina cacumina N.E.Br.
- Monnina callimorpha Chodat
- Monnina canescens Ferreyra
- Monnina cardiocarpa A.St.-Hil. & Moq.
- Monnina carmelensis B.Eriksen
- Monnina celastroides (Bonpl.) Chodat
- Monnina cestrifolia (Bonpl.) Kunth
- Monnina chimborazeana Chodat
- Monnina chlamydantha Ferreyra
- Monnina chodatiana Ferreyra
- Monnina ciliolata Moc. & Sessé ex DC.
- Monnina cladostachya Turcz.
- Monnina clarkeana Chodat
- Monnina colombiana Ferreyra
- Monnina conferta Ruiz & Pav.
- Monnina confusa Ferreyra
- Monnina connectisepala Chodat
- Monnina costaricensis Chodat
- Monnina crassifolia (Bonpl.) Kunth
- Monnina crassinervia Triana & Planch.
- Monnina crepinii Chodat
- Monnina cuatrecasasii Ferreyra
- Monnina cuneata A.St.-Hil. & Moq.
- Monnina cyanea Chodat
- Monnina decurrens Ferreyra
- Monnina densa Planch. & Linden ex Wedd.
- Monnina densecomata Chodat
- Monnina denticulata Chodat
- Monnina dictyocarpa Griseb.
- Monnina dugandiana Ferreyra
- Monnina duidae S.F.Blake
- Monnina ebracteata Ferreyra
- Monnina elongata Planch. & Linden
- Monnina emarginata A.St.-Hil. & Moq.
- Monnina equatoriensis Chodat
- Monnina erecta Ferreyra
- Monnina exalata A.W.Benn.
- Monnina fastigiata (Bonpl.) DC.
- Monnina ferreyrae C.M.Taylor
- Monnina filifolia Chodat
- Monnina fosbergii Ferreyra
- Monnina franchetii Chodat
- Monnina glaberrima Chodat
- Monnina glabrifolia Ferreyra
- Monnina goiana Freire-Fierro & J.F.B.Pastore
- Monnina gracilis Chodat
- Monnina grandifolia Ferreyra
- Monnina guatemalensis Chodat
- Monnina hassleri Chodat
- Monnina haughtii Ferreyra
- Monnina herbacea DC.
- Monnina herrerae Ferreyra
- Monnina herzogii Chodat
- Monnina hirtella Ferreyra
- Monnina idroboana Ferreyra
- Monnina intermedia Arechav.
- Monnina itapoanensis F.M.S.Vianna & Marques
- Monnina latifolia (Bonpl.) DC.
- Monnina laureola Chodat
- Monnina lechleriana Chodat
- Monnina lehmanniana Chodat
- Monnina leptostachya Benth.
- Monnina ligustrina (Bonpl.) B.Eriksen
- Monnina linearifolia Ruiz & Pav.
- Monnina longibracteata Chodat
- Monnina lorenziana Chodat
- Monnina loxensis Benth.
- Monnina macbridei Chodat
- Monnina macrocarpa Chodat
- Monnina macroclada Chodat
- Monnina macrosepala Chodat
- Monnina macrostachya Ruiz & Pav.
- Monnina marginata C.Presl
- Monnina martiana Klotzsch ex A.W.Benn.
- Monnina mathusiana Chodat
- Monnina membranifolia Ferreyra
- Monnina menthoides Chodat
- Monnina meridensis Planch. & Linden ex Wedd.
- Monnina mollis Planch. & Linden
- Monnina mucronata Arechav.
- Monnina neurophylla B.Eriksen
- Monnina nitida Chodat
- Monnina oblanceolata Ferreyra
- Monnina oblongifolia Arechav.
- Monnina obovata Chodat & Sodiro
- Monnina ovata Ferreyra
- Monnina pachycoma Chodat
- Monnina padifolia (Bonpl.) Freire-Fierro
- Monnina parasylvatica C.M.Taylor
- Monnina parviflora (Bonpl.) Kunth
- Monnina parvifolia Ferreyra
- Monnina pavonii Chodat
- Monnina pearcii Chodat
- Monnina pennellii Ferreyra
- Monnina philippiana Chodat
- Monnina pichinchensis B.Eriksen
- Monnina pittieri Chodat
- Monnina polygonoides Chodat
- Monnina polystachya Ruiz & Pav.
- Monnina pseudopilosa Ferreyra
- Monnina pseudopolystachya Chodat
- Monnina pseudosalicifolia Ferreyra
- Monnina pseudostipulata Chodat
- Monnina pterocarpa Ruiz & Pav.
- Monnina pubescens (Bonpl.) Kunth
- Monnina pulchra Chodat
- Monnina pumila Ferreyra
- Monnina pycnophylla B.Eriksen
- Monnina ramosa I.M.Johnst.
- Monnina ramosissima Arechav.
- Monnina resedoides A.St.-Hil. & Moq.
- Monnina reticulata B.Eriksen
- Monnina richardiana A.St.-Hil. & Moq.
- Monnina rugosa Chodat
- Monnina ruiziana Chodat
- Monnina rusbyi Chodat
- Monnina salicifolia Ruiz & Pav.
- Monnina sandemanii Ferreyra
- Monnina sanmarcosana Ferreyra
- Monnina santamartensis Ferreyra
- Monnina saprogena Donn.Sm.
- Monnina schlechtendaliana D.Dietr.
- Monnina schultesii Ferreyra
- Monnina smithii Chodat
- Monnina sodiroana Chodat
- Monnina solandrifolia Triana & Planch.
- Monnina soukupiana Ferreyra
- Monnina speciosa Triana & Planch.
- Monnina splendens B.Eriksen
- Monnina stenophylla A.St.-Hil. & Moq.
- Monnina steyermarkii Ferreyra
- Monnina stipulata Chodat
- Monnina subscandens Triana & Planch.
- Monnina subserrata Chodat
- Monnina subspeciosa Chodat
- Monnina sylvatica Schltdl. & Cham.
- Monnina sylvicola Chodat
- Monnina tatei Ferreyra
- Monnina tenuifolia Chodat
- Monnina tomentella Chodat
- Monnina tristaniana A.St.-Hil. & Moq.
- Monnina valcareliana Ferreyra
- Monnina vargasii Ferreyra
- Monnina venezuelensis Ferreyra
- Monnina virescens Arechav.
- Monnina weddelliana Chodat
- Monnina woytkowskii Ferreyra
- Monnina wrightii A.Gray
- Monnina wurdackii Ferreyra
- Monnina xalapensis Kunth
