= Carpolobia =

Scientific classification
- Kingdom: Plantae
- Clade: Embryophytes
- Clade: Tracheophytes
- Clade: Spermatophytes
- Clade: Angiosperms
- Clade: Eudicots
- Clade: Rosids
- Order: Fabales
- Family: Polygalaceae
- Tribe: Carpolobieae
- Genus: Carpolobia; G.Don (1831)

Synonyms
- Falya Desc. (1957)

Genus of flowering plants

Carpolobia is a genus of plants in the milkwort family (Polygalaceae) that are native to tropical Africa and Madagascar. It was first written about in 1831 by George Don, at which point 4 species were identified. In 1849, the number of accepted species went down to two. The other two became part of the legume family. The two species that remained, C. alba and C. lutea, were described as closely resembling each other. It was initially in the Polygaleae tribe before being split off in 1992 along with the genus Atroxima to form the new tribe of Carpolobieae.

== Description ==
Carpolobia are shrubs, small trees, or lianas. They produce flowers with 5 petals. Its fruit are smooth, drupaceous, and uni- to tri-locular. They are 2 by 2.5 by 2.5 centimetres (0.79 by 0.98 by 0.98 in) and yellow to red-orange at maturity. The fruit's endocarp and exocarp are thin and its mesocarp is fleshy.

== Species ==
As of April 2024, there are five accepted species:

- Carpolobia alba G.Don
- Carpolobia gabonica Breteler
- Carpolobia goetzei Gürke
- Carpolobia gossweileri (Exell) E.M.A.Petit
- Carpolobia lutea G.Don
