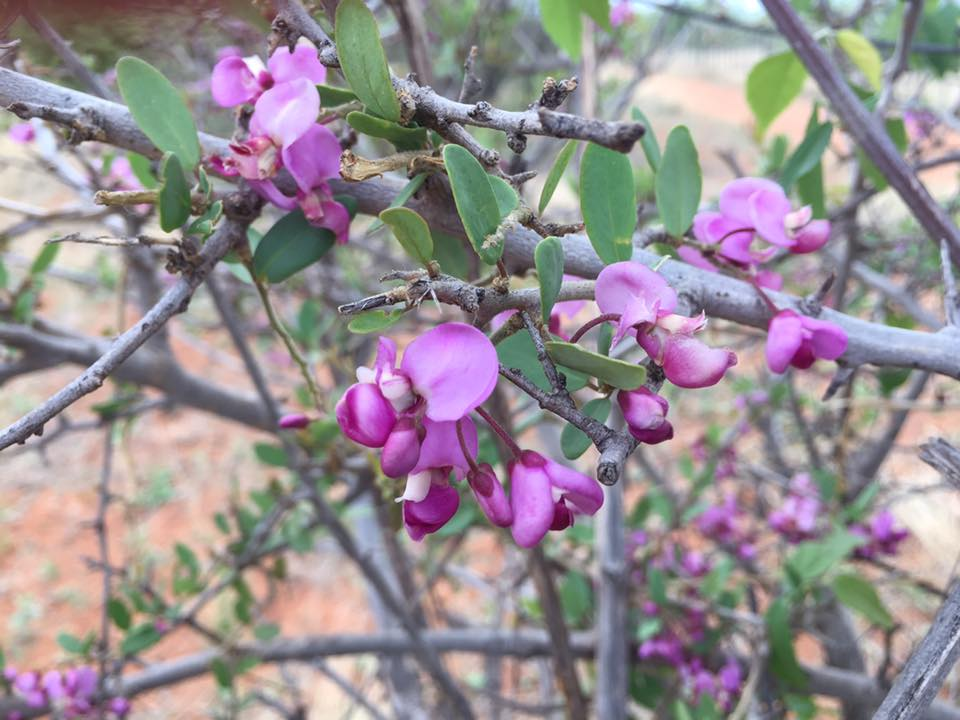

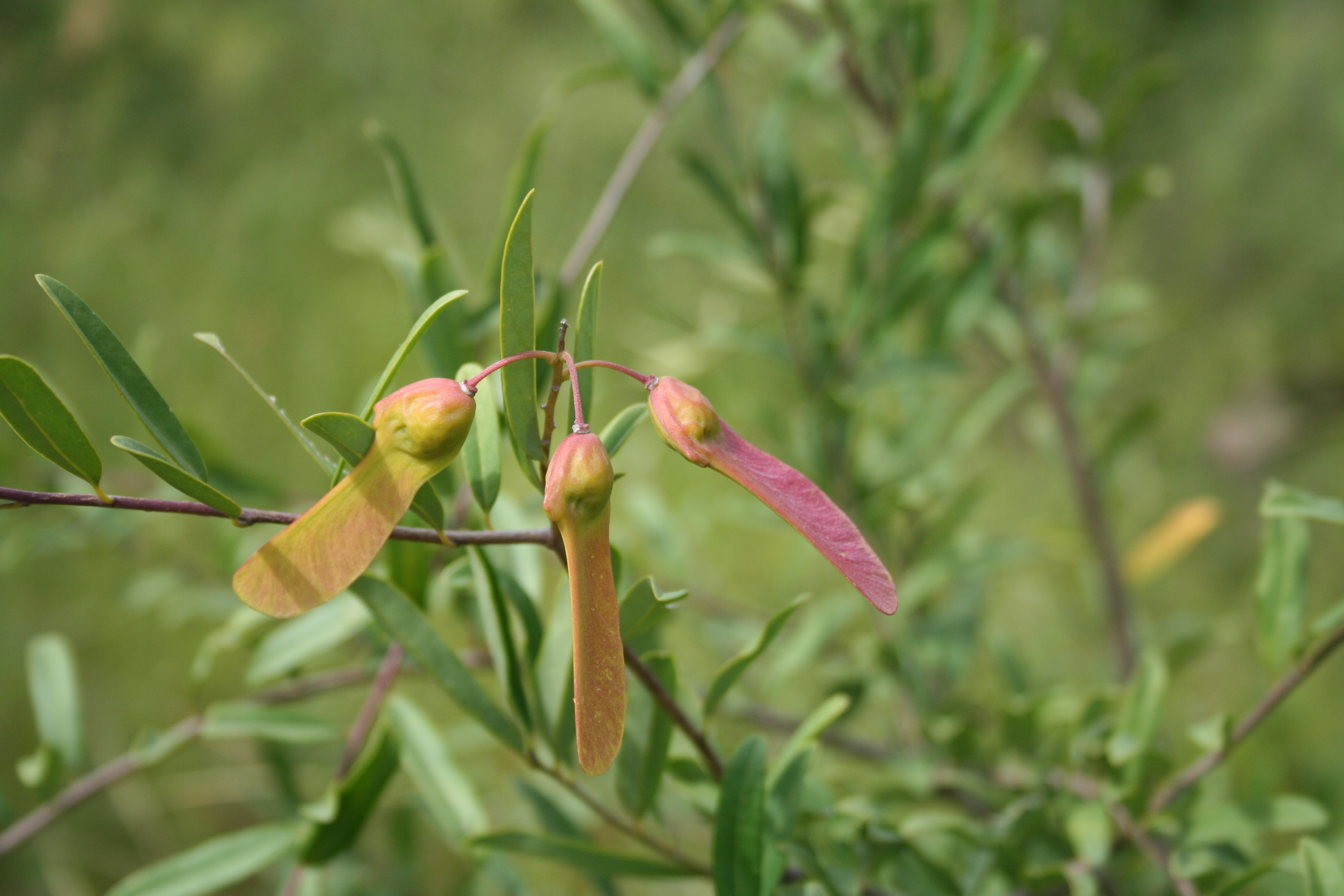

Scientific classification
- Kingdom: Plantae
- Clade: Tracheophytes
- Clade: Angiosperms
- Clade: Eudicots
- Clade: Rosids
- Order: Fabales
- Family: Polygalaceae
- Genus: Securidaca
- Species: S. longepedunculata

Binomial name
- Securidaca longepedunculata Fresen.

Synonyms
- Elsota longipedunculata (Fresen.) Kuntze; Lophostylis angustifolia Hochst.; Lophostylis oblongifolia Hochst.; Lophostylis pallida Klotzsch; Securidaca angustifolia Miq.; Securidaca longepedunculata var. angustifolia Robyns; Securidaca longepedunculata var. parvifolia Oliv.; Securidaca oblongifolia Benth. & Hook.f. ex Sond.; Securidaca spinosa Sim

= Securidaca longepedunculata =

Violet tree

Species of tree

Securidaca longepedunculata (violet tree, Afrikaans: krinkhout, Bambara: satene, Tswana: mmaba, Venda: mpesu, Yoruba: ìpẹ̀ta) is a species of tree in the genus Securidaca. It is most commonly found in the tropical and subtropical areas of Africa, and it was given protected status in South Africa. The generic name is derived from Latin securis, as the shape of the wing on the nut recalls a hatchet. The specific name longepedunculata hints at the long peduncle on which the flowers are borne.

== Description ==
It is a fairly small to medium-sized tree, measuring between 6 and 12 meters tall. It has pale grey, smooth bark with leaves that grow in clusters. Its small branches are covered in very fine hair. The tree produces flowers in the early part of the austral summer, and these progress from a pink to purple colour. They are sweetly scented and grow in small bunches on a peduncle. The fruit is round and is attached to a wing that becomes up to 40 mm long. The tree carries fruit between April and August.

== Range and habitat ==
S. longepedunculata is widespread in sub-Saharan Africa, ranging from Senegal to Ethiopia and south to the Northern Provinces of South Africa. It is found in various types of woodlands and in arid savannas, and its habit varies according to climate and elevation. It may be found on either sandy, acidic or rocky soils. It is native to the North West and Limpopo provinces of South Africa, and is locally present northwards in the African subtropics and tropics. In tropical savanna, it is especially found in miombo and caesalpinoid woodland.

== Threats and conservation ==
The species suffers from over-harvesting for use in local medicines. Periodic droughts and bush fires are also a hazard for the propagation of this tree. It is listed on the National Forests Act of 1998 of South Africa, where it is noted as a protected tree. The Royal Botanic Gardens, Kew, has also included the species in their “Adopt a seed - save a species” campaign. The campaign enables the public to purchase a Violet tree in order to protect the species and assist local communities in Mali. The initiative forms part of the Millennium Seed Bank Partnership.

== Research and applications in traditional medicine ==
Recent ethnopharmacological studies have highlighted the significance of Securidaca longepedunculata, commonly known as the violet tree or mpesu, in traditional African medicine. The plant is utilized for various medicinal purposes, including as an aphrodisiac to address low libido. A comprehensive review by Mongalo et al. (2015) documents its use in treating sexually transmitted infections and as an aphrodisiac for men.

The roots of S. longepedunculata are particularly valued in traditional medicine. However, this has led to overexploitation, as the harvesting of roots can be detrimental to the plant's survival. The South African National Biodiversity Institute notes that the species is threatened due to the targeting of its roots for medicinal use.

In response to conservation concerns, organizations like African Heals have initiated efforts to sustainably cultivate S. longepedunculata to ensure the plant's availability for future generations. Collaborations with institutions such as the University of South Africa (UNISA) have been established, where the plant is supplied for research purposes aimed at validating its medicinal properties and exploring sustainable harvesting methods.

These combined efforts in research and conservation are crucial for preserving S. longepedunculata, ensuring that its medicinal benefits can continue to be utilized while maintaining ecological balance.

== Common uses ==
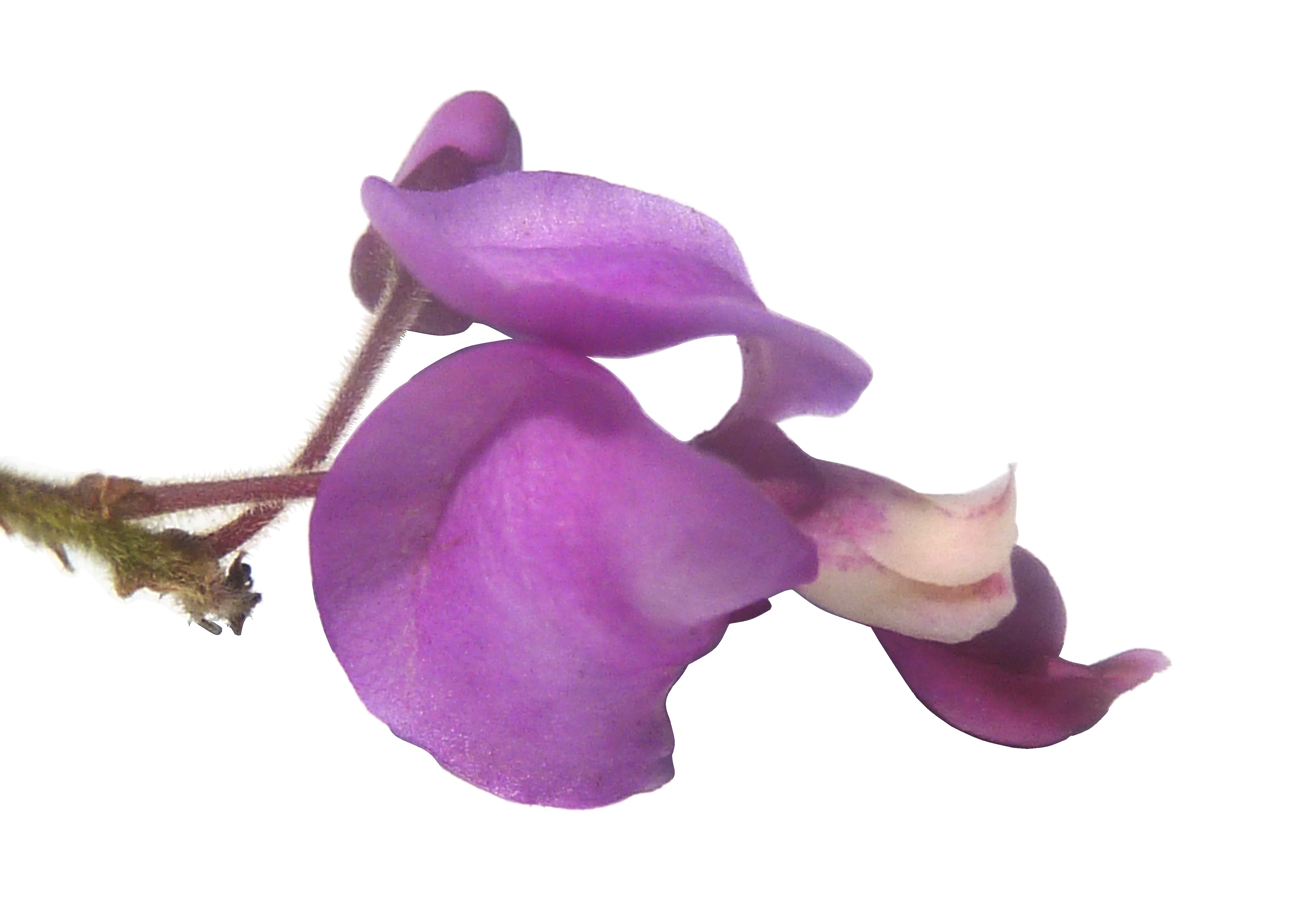
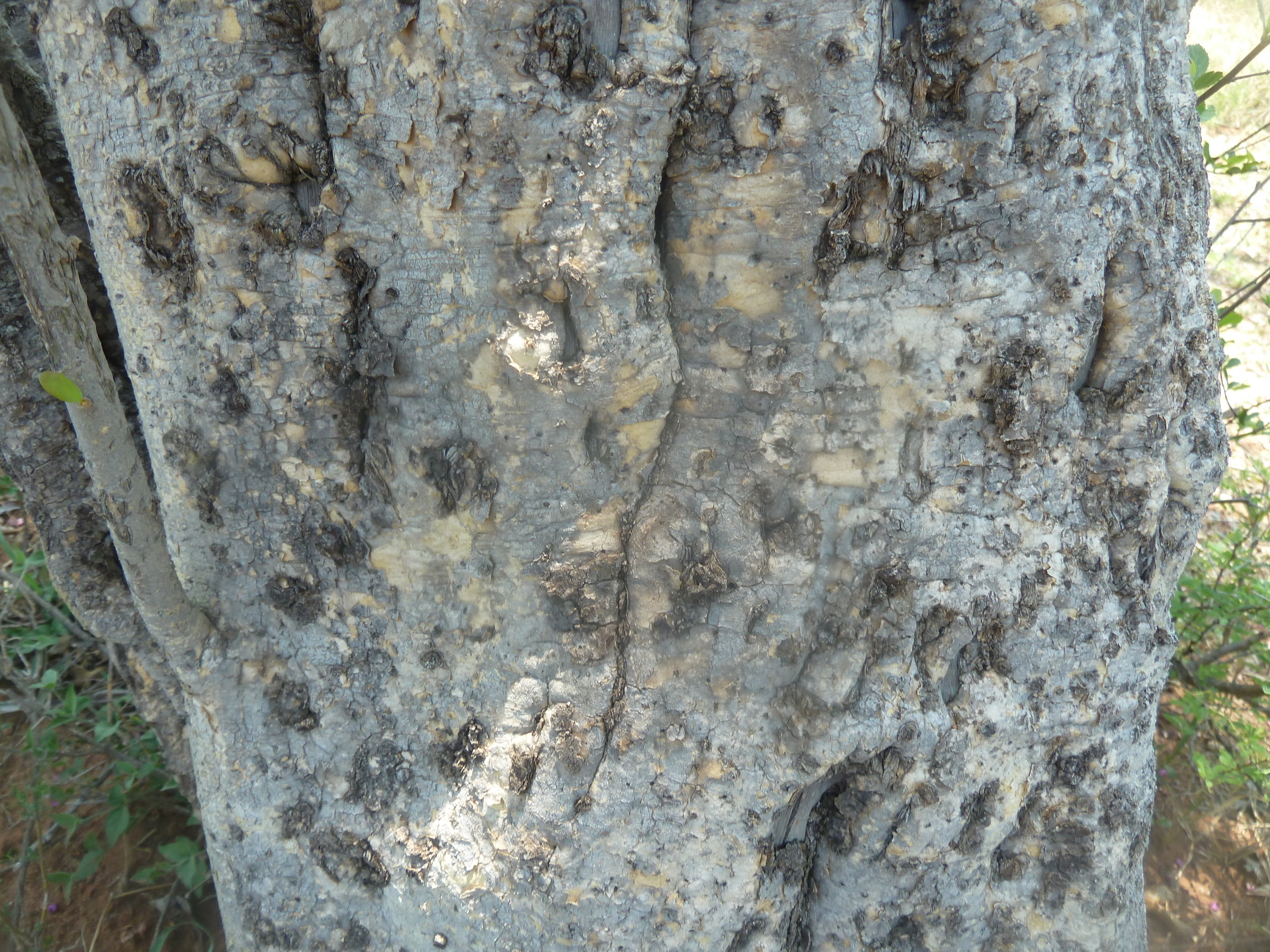
flower and bark

The uses made of the plant in Africa are many. It is used in traditional medicine to treat a wide variety of conditions, from minor transient ailments such as headaches to severe, chronic conditions such as arthritis. This tree is also commonly used as pesticide against beetles in stored grains. This technique can be very helpful for small-scale subsistence farmers in Africa who are not able to purchase synthetic pesticides.

The roots are used to treat human ailments such as coughs, respiratory infections, toothache, gout, fevers, constipation, diabetes and microbial infections. It also possesses anti-inflammatory properties that help to reduce arthritic pains. Uses of this tree vary across different countries. A combination of both the methanol extract and the methyl salicylate component from the roots of the plant create a poison that is used for multiple purposes. This poison is used on arrows to hunt with in West Africa. In Limpopo, the VhaVenda people use the roots to prevent mental disorders and they believe that this remedy will also protect children from illnesses during breastfeeding. People in Zimbabwe use the roots to treat people who seem to be possessed by evil spirits and it is often used on snake bites. Soap, fishing nets, and baskets can be made with the bark of the tree. This tree is also used by subsistence farmers in maintaining their granaries: the bark and roots are ground into powder and mixed with stored grains for their pesticidal effect against various beetles. This alternative to synthetic pesticides is necessary for small-scale farmers in Africa who may not have the resources or money needed for synthetic pesticides.

=== As a pesticide ===
Its roots can be ground into a fine powder which is used to protect stored grains. Methyl salicylate is a well-known plant stress signal which often has insect repellent properties. Methyl salicylate constitutes up to 90% of the volatile component of its roots, which is very uncommon in other grains or legume seeds. A mixture of methanol extract and methyl salicylate creates a very effective natural pesticide against weevils and other insects in stored grains. Studies done on grains such as corn and cowpea indicated that after 6 days of exposure to S. longepedunculata, the mortality rate of adult beetles was 100% in an enclosed jar. In addition, when S. longepedunculata powder was applied to grains already infested with weevils, the damage done to the grains was reduced by 65%. The beetles that are most likely to infest stored grains are Sitophilus zeamais (maize weevil), Rhyzopertha dominica (lesser grain borer), and Prostephanus truncatus (larger grain borer). Studies suggest that the maize weevil is able to detect the scent of methyl salicylate and tends to avoid it. It is a repellent for insects as well as a poison, which helps to reduce the number of female eggs in the grains. As this type of pesticide use is very efficient, it allows storage of the grains for at least 9 months. This discovery provides some small-scale farmers in Africa with a low cost, natural alternative to synthetic pesticides. In some developing countries, it is difficult for poor farmers to access good quality and affordable synthetic pesticides. In addition these can harm the environment if they are not properly implemented. Such indigenous practices require further validation.

=== Constraints to wider adoption ===
The practice of using S. longepedunculata as a common pesticide for stored grains is not a widespread solution. Although it is very efficient to use this species as a tool to store grains for longer periods of time, there are constraints to wider adoption rates. A very significant problem is scarcity in natural resources. S. longepedunculata is used for various different purposes, and they often involve the roots of the plant. If the root of the plant is always being cut, it is difficult for the plant to be harvested constantly. There is little incentive to invest in a project like this because there is no assurance that the starting material can be reproduced in sufficient quantities. In addition, studies have shown that a specific concentration of the active ingredient, methyl salicylate, is needed for the powder to effectively work as a pesticide. Improved technologies are needed in order to fully cover all the seeds with the powder in order for the repellent to work. Turning over the crops and mixing it by hand can be very labor-intensive for the farmer and it doesn’t always assure full coverage of the seeds. One solution could be to create an extract by mixing the powder with water. An extract would be useful for maize seeds because the glassy surface of maize prevents the powder from adhering to its surface. This will allow the pesticide to be evenly spread out, although more tests and studies need to be done to improve this technique.
