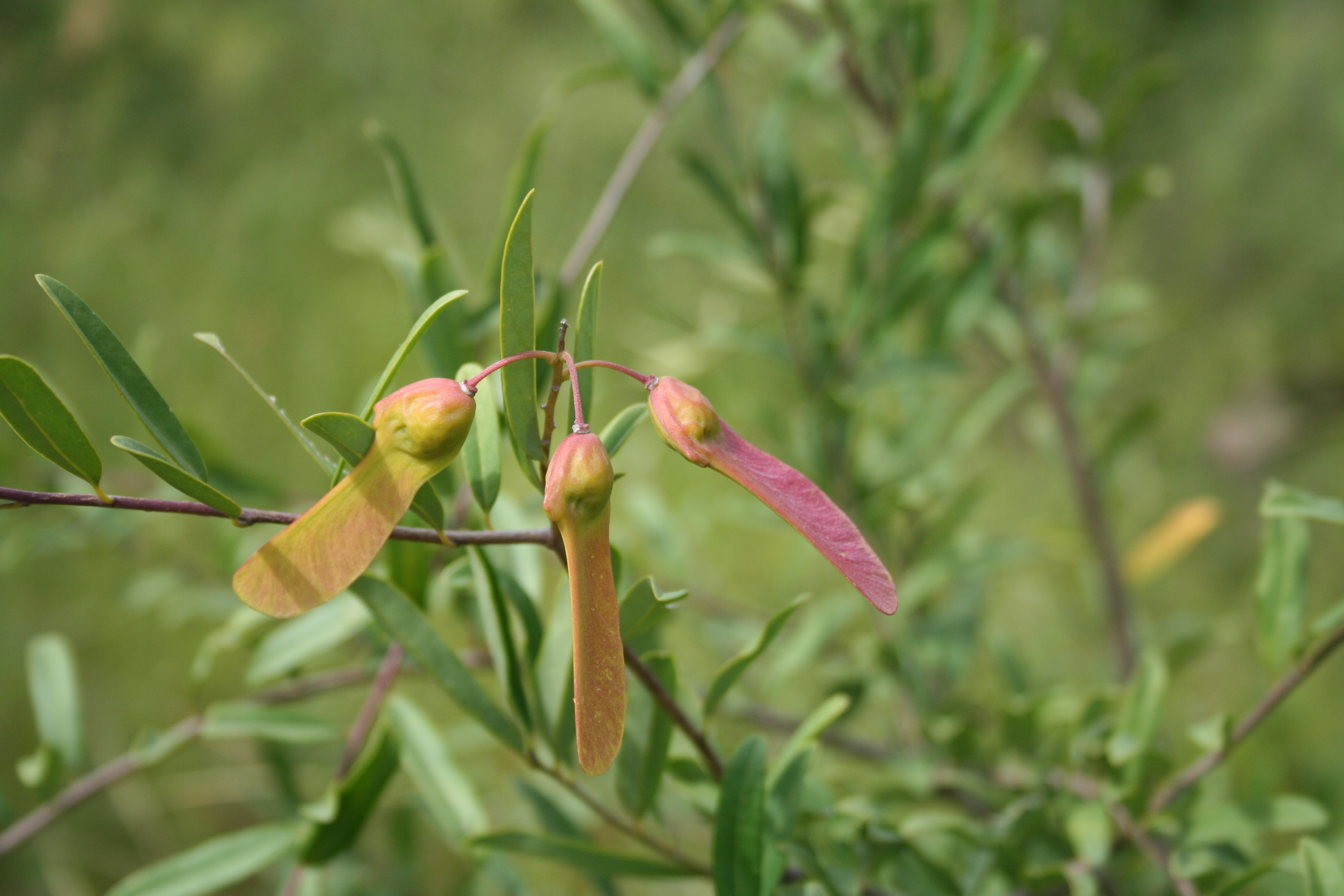
- Securidaca longepedunculata

Scientific classification
- Kingdom: Plantae
- Clade: Embryophytes
- Clade: Tracheophytes
- Clade: Angiosperms
- Clade: Eudicots
- Clade: Rosids
- Order: Fabales
- Family: Polygalaceae; Hoffmanns. & Link

Type genus
- Polygala L.

Tribes
- See text.
- Distribution of the Polygalaceae

Synonyms
- Diclidantheraceae J. Agardh; Moutabeaceae Pfeiffer; Xanthophyllaceae Reveal & Hoogland

= Polygalaceae =

Family of flowering plants

The Polygalaceae or the milkwort family are made up of flowering plants in the order Fabales. They have a near-cosmopolitan range, with about 27 genera and ca. 900 known species of herbs, shrubs and trees. Over half of the species are in one genus, Polygala, the milkworts.

The family was first described in 1809 by Johann Hoffmansegg and Johann Link. In 1896, Robert Chodat split it into three tribes. A fourth tribe was split off from the tribe Polygaleae in 1992. Under the Cronquist classification system, Polygalaceae were treated in a separate order of their own, Polygalales. Currently, according to the Angiosperm Phylogeny Group, the family belongs in Fabales.

== Description ==
Polygalaceae are annual or perennial herbs, shrubs, trees or lianas. Its zygomorphic, hermaphrodite, bisexual flowers have three to five petals and five sepals. Its leaves are usually alternate, but may be opposite, fascicled, or verticillate. Each flower usually contains eight stamens, though this may range from three to ten. They are usually in two series. The fruits of each plant can be a capsule, samara, or drupe.

== Tribes and genera ==
The Polygalaceae comprise the following genera, with tribes based on various sources.

- Carpolobieae Eriksen
  - Atroxima Stapf
  - Carpolobia G. Don
- Moutabeae Chodat
  - Barnhartia Gleason
  - Diclidanthera Mart.
  - Eriandra P. Royen & Steenis
  - Moutabea Aubl.
- Polygaleae Chodat
  - Acanthocladus Klotzsch ex Hassk.
  - Ancylotropis B.Eriksen
  - Asemeia Raf.
  - Badiera DC.
  - Bredemeyera Willd.
  - Caamembeca J.F.B. Pastore
  - Chamaebuxus Tourn. (synonym Polygaloides Haller)
  - Comesperma Labill.
  - Epirixanthes Blume
  - Gymnospora (Chodat) J.F.B.Pastore
  - Hebecarpa (Chodat) J.R.Abbott
  - Heterosamara Kuntze
  - Hualania Phil.
  - Monnina Ruiz & Pav.
  - Monrosia Grondona
  - Muraltia DC.
  - Phlebotaenia Griseb.
  - Polygala L.
  - Rhamphopetalum J.F.B.Pastore & M.Mota
  - Rhinotropis (S.F. Blake) J.R. Abbott
  - Salomonia Lour.
  - Securidaca L.
  - Senega (DC.) Spach
- Xanthophylleae Chodat
  - Xanthophyllum Roxb.

=== Fossils ===
- †Deviacer Manchester
- †Paleosecuridaca Pigg, Kathleen B., M.L. DeVore & M.F. Wojc. 2008

== Systematics ==
Modern molecular phylogenetics suggest the following relationships:

- - Surianaceae (outgroup)
  - Polygalaceae
    - Xanthophylleae
      Xanthophyllum
    - - Moutabeae
        - - Moutabea
          - Balgoya (now included in Moutabea)
        - - Eriandra
          - - Barnhartia
            - Diclidanthera
      - - Carpolobieae
          - Atroxima
          - Carpolobia
        - Polygaleae
          - Clade I
            - Bredemeyera
            - - Acanthocladus
              - - Gymnospora
                - - Hebecarpa
                  - Badiera
          - Clade II
            - - Securidaca
              - - - Phlebotaenia
                  - Rhinotropis
                - - Comesperma
                  - - Ancylotropis
                    - Monnina
            - - - Asemeia
                - Caamembeca
              - - Hualania
                - - - - Heterosamara
                      - - Polygaloides
                        - Polygala subgen. Chodatia
                    - - Salomonia
                      - Epirixanthes
                  - - Polygala subgen. Polygala (Old World Clade)
                    - Polygala subgen. Polygala (New World Clade)
                  - Muraltia
