= Dehiwala-Mount Lavinia Municipal Council =

Local authority in Sri Lanka

Dehiwala Mount Lavinia Municipal Council දෙහිවල ගල්කිස්ස මහ නගර සභාව தெஹிவளை கல்கிசை மாநகர சபை
- Official Seal

Type
- Type: Local authority of the Dehiwala-Mount Lavinia

History
- Founded: 1940; 85 years ago
- Preceded by: Dehiwala-Mount Lavinia Urban Council (1940-1959); Wellawatte-Galkissa Electoral District (1947-1960)

Leadership
- Mayor: Killapanage Don Parakum Shantha, (NPP)
- Deputy Mayor: Vindana Edirisooriya, (NPP)

Structure
- Seats: 54
- Political groups: Government: NPP (29); Opposition: SJB (10); UNP (5); SLPP (4); SB (3); PA (2); Independents (1)
- Committees: See Departments
- Length of term: Four years

Elections
- Voting system: Mixed: 60% First-past-the-post; 40% closed list proportional representation
- Last election: 6 May 2025
- Next election: TBD

Meeting place
- Galle Rd, Dehiwala-Mount Lavinia, Sri Lanka

Website
- Dehiwala-Mount Lavinia Municipal Council

Dehiwala Mount Lavinia Municipal Council (DMMC) is the local authority for the city of Dehiwala-Mount Lavinia in Sri Lanka. The Council is responsible for providing a variety of local public services including roads, sanitation, drains, housing, libraries, public parks and recreational facilities. It has 48 members elected under the mixed electoral system where 60% of members will be elected using first-past-the-post voting and the remaining 40% through closed list proportional representation.

== History ==
The area covered by the present Dehiwala Mount Lavinia Municipal Council was part of the Kingdom of Kotte. It comprised a number of villages, including Pepiliyana Nedimala, Attidiya and Kalubowila. The areas south of Dehiwala together with Ratmalana were one large expanse of marshland that was sparsely populated.

In the late 16th century the Kingdom of Kotte was ruled by the Portuguese controlled king, Dharmapala. The administrative structure of the area during this time was the Gansabha system as prevailed earlier. In the early 17th century, the Dutch brought a more organised administrative structure from which a broad based taxation and legal system evolved. In the 19th century the British replaced this with a provincial administrative (Kachcheri) system, which led to the current form of local government developing.

In 1937 Dehiwela Mount Lavinia was a local body of six wards extending over 16.3 km^{2} (6.3 sq mi). In 1959 this area was extended and divided into nineteen wards and given municipal status because of its rapid urban growth and for administrative reasons. In 1967 the municipal area of approximately 2,109 ha (5,210 acres) was apportioned into 29 wards, as it exists today.

== Demographics ==
Dehiwala Mount Lavinia Municipality area is a multi-religious, multi-ethnic, multi-cultural city.

Population by Religion (2012)
1. Buddhists (60.8%)
2. Muslims (16.4%)
3. Hinduism (8.73%)
4. Catholics (6.95%)
5. Other Christians (4.51%)
6. Other (2.62%)

Religious Identification in Dehiwala-Mount Lavinia Municipality area
	Population (2012)	% of Total
Buddhist	111,330	60.84%
Islam	29,928	16.35%
Hindu	15,978	8.73%
Roman Catholic	12,726	6.95%
Other Christian	8,250	4.51%
Other	4,784	2.61%
Total	182,996	100.00%

Population by Ethnicity (2012)
1. Sinhalese (70.2%)
2. Sri Lankan Moors (14.7%)
3. Sri Lankan Tamils (11.3%)
4. Other (3.81%)

Ethnic Identification in Dehiwala-Mount Lavinia Municipality area
	Population (2012)	% of Total
Sinhalese	128,363	70.15%
Sri Lankan Moor	26,875	14.69%
Sri Lankan Tamil	20,769	11.35%
Burgher	2,609	1.43%
Indian Tamil	2,095	1.14%
Malay	1,102	0.60%
Other	964	0.53%
Sri Lankan Chetty	139	0.08%
Baratha	80	0.04%
Total	182,996	100.00%

== Wards ==
Dehiwala Mount Lavinia municipality is the second largest in Sri Lanka covering 21.09 km^{2} (8.14 sq mi). It lies to the south of the Colombo Municipal Council area separated by the Dehiwala canal which acts as the northern boundary of the municipality. Borupana Road lies at the southern limits and Weras Ganga to the east.

There are 29 wards in the Dehiwala Mount Lavinia Municipal Council.

No#	Ward	Area (Ha)
1	Wilawila	50.2
2	Dutugemunu	76.9
3	Kohuwela	85.0
4	Kalubowila	50.6
5	Hathbodhiyawatta	40.2
6	Saranankara	36.5
7	Galwala	45.8
8	Dehiwela West	47.5
9	Dehiwela East	46.7
10	Uddyana	51.7
11	Nedimala	74.0
12	Malwatta	36.6
13	Jayatilake	39.5
14	Karagampitiya	40.7
15	Kawudana East	120.7
16	Kawudana West	51.8
17	Mount Lavinia	29.1
18	Vidyalaya	74.9
19	Wattarappola	39.5
20	Katukurundawatta	115.8
21	Atthidiya North	114.3
22	Wathumulla	54.6
23	Wedikanda	64.3
24	Pirivena	63.2
25	Atthidiya South	140.2
26	Vihara	68.3
27	Ratmalana West	38.4
28	Ratmalana East	106.3
29	Kadawala	305.6
Total		2,109

== Council ==
=== Mayors ===
Parties

Independent United National Party Sri Lanka Freedom Party Sri Lanka Podujana Peramuna National People's Power

Name	Term of office	Notes	Ref
L. V. Gooneratne	1961–1971	First mayor of DMMC	
Susil De Silva Jayasinghe	1990–1995		
Sunethra Ranasinghe	1996-2002		
Danasiri Amaratunga	2002–2005		
Danasiri Amaratunga	2005–2018		
Stanley Dias	2018–2023		
Killapanage Don Parakum Shantha	2025–present		

=== Departments ===
The Dehiwala Mount Lavinia Municipal Council comprises ten departments:

- Department of Administration
- Department of Finance
- Department of Engineers
- Department of Mechanical Engineers
- Department of Legal
- Department of Health and Solid Waste Magagement
- Department of Sport and Social Welfare
- Department of Electrical
- Department of Fire
- Department of Health
