= Jayasiri Semage =

Sri Lankan artist and newspaper illustrator

- ජයසිරි සේමගේ
- Born: 1938; Ambalangoda, British Ceylon
- Died: 25 August 2021 (aged 82–83); Dehiwala, Sri Lanka
- Education: Dharmasoka College
- Occupation: Artist
- Awards: Kala Suri

Kalasuri Jayasiri Semage (born 1938) (Sinhala: ජයසිරි සේමගේ) is a Sri Lankan artist and newspaper illustrator. His paintings ranging from postcard to gigantic creations of over 40 feet in length can be seen in Sri Lanka. He is known for painting historic scenes

== Personal life ==
Jayasiri Semage was born in 1938 in Ambalangoda, British Ceylon (now Sri Lanka). He studied at the Dharmasoka College, Ambalangoda. He died on 25 August 2021 at the age of 84 at his residence in Nedimala, Dehiwala.

== Career ==
Exhibitions of Artist Semage have been held in several countries, as well as in Colombo The Main Hall of the UN Center in Geneva (Switzerland) has displayed his paintings, and 'Hands that protect the mother land' in on permanent display. At the Sri Lanka Embassies in Stockholm (Sweden) Manila (Philippines Islands) and the Headquarters of the People Bank in Colombo his creations are also displayed. His work has also been displayed in Oman. His art has also been exhibited in Malaysia. In Australia, three of his works in oil 300 cm X 260 cm in dimension, depicting Asala pageant (perahera) at Kandy, Sri Lanka, and Sri Lanka rural scenes are on permanent display in the large 'Cinnamon' Sri Lankan restaurant in Melbourne.
