= Udyanaya Grama Niladhari Division =

Udyanaya
- Grama Niladhari Division
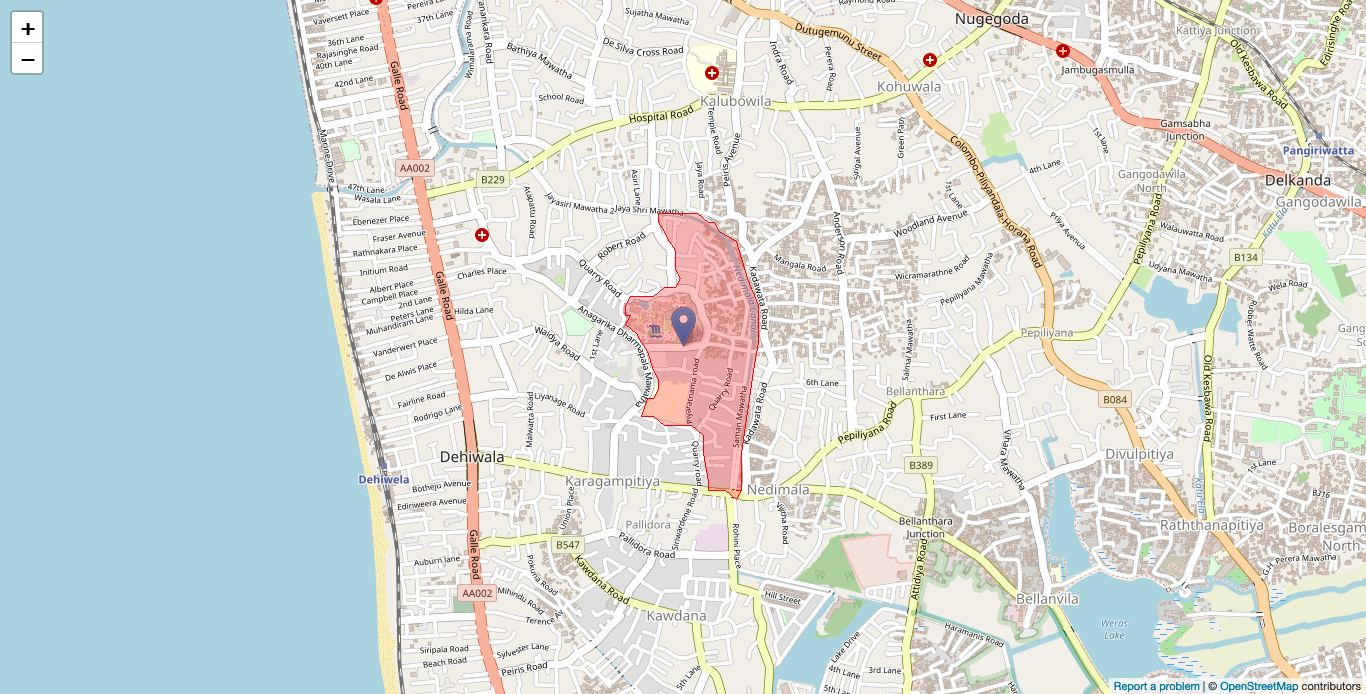
- Udyanaya Grama Niladhari Division
- Coordinates: 6.855963°N 79.875015°E
- Country: Sri Lanka
- Province: Western Province
- District: Colombo District
- Divisional Secretariat: Dehiwala Divisional Secretariat
- Electoral District: Colombo Electoral District
- Polling Division: Dehiwala Polling Division

Area
  - Total: 0.53 km^{2} (0.20 sq mi)
- Elevation: 37 m (121 ft)

Population (2012)
  - Total: 5,914
  - Density: 11,158/km^{2} (28,900/sq mi)
- ISO 3166 code: LK-1130050

Udyanaya Grama Niladhari Division is a Grama Niladhari Division of the Dehiwala Divisional Secretariat of Colombo District of Western Province, Sri Lanka . It has Grama Niladhari Division Code 536A.

National Zoological Gardens of Sri Lanka is located within, nearby or associated with Udyanaya.

Udyanaya is a surrounded by the Dehiwala East, Kalubovila, Karagampitiya, Nedimala, Kawdana East, Malwatta and Galwala Grama Niladhari Divisions.

== Demographics ==
=== Ethnicity ===
The Udyanaya Grama Niladhari Division has a Sinhalese majority (71.1%) and a significant Moor population (21.2%) . In comparison, the Dehiwala Divisional Secretariat (which contains the Udyanaya Grama Niladhari Division) has a Sinhalese majority (60.5%), a significant Moor population (20.8%) and a significant Sri Lankan Tamil population (14.5%)

Ethnicity in Udyanaya
1. Sinhalese (71.1%)
2. Moor (21.2%)
3. Sri Lankan Tamil (4.20%)
4. Burgher (1.60%)
5. Malay (1.10%)
6. Other (0.80%)

=== Religion ===
The Udyanaya Grama Niladhari Division has a Buddhist majority (67.8%) and a significant Muslim population (22.4%) . In comparison, the Dehiwala Divisional Secretariat (which contains the Udyanaya Grama Niladhari Division) has a Buddhist majority (54.3%), a significant Muslim population (22.6%) and a significant Hindu population (12.1%)

Religion in Udyanaya
1. Buddhist (67.8%)
2. Muslim (22.4%)
3. Hindu (4.10%)
4. Roman Catholic (3.70%)
5. Other Christian (1.90%)
6. Other (0.20%)

== Gallery ==
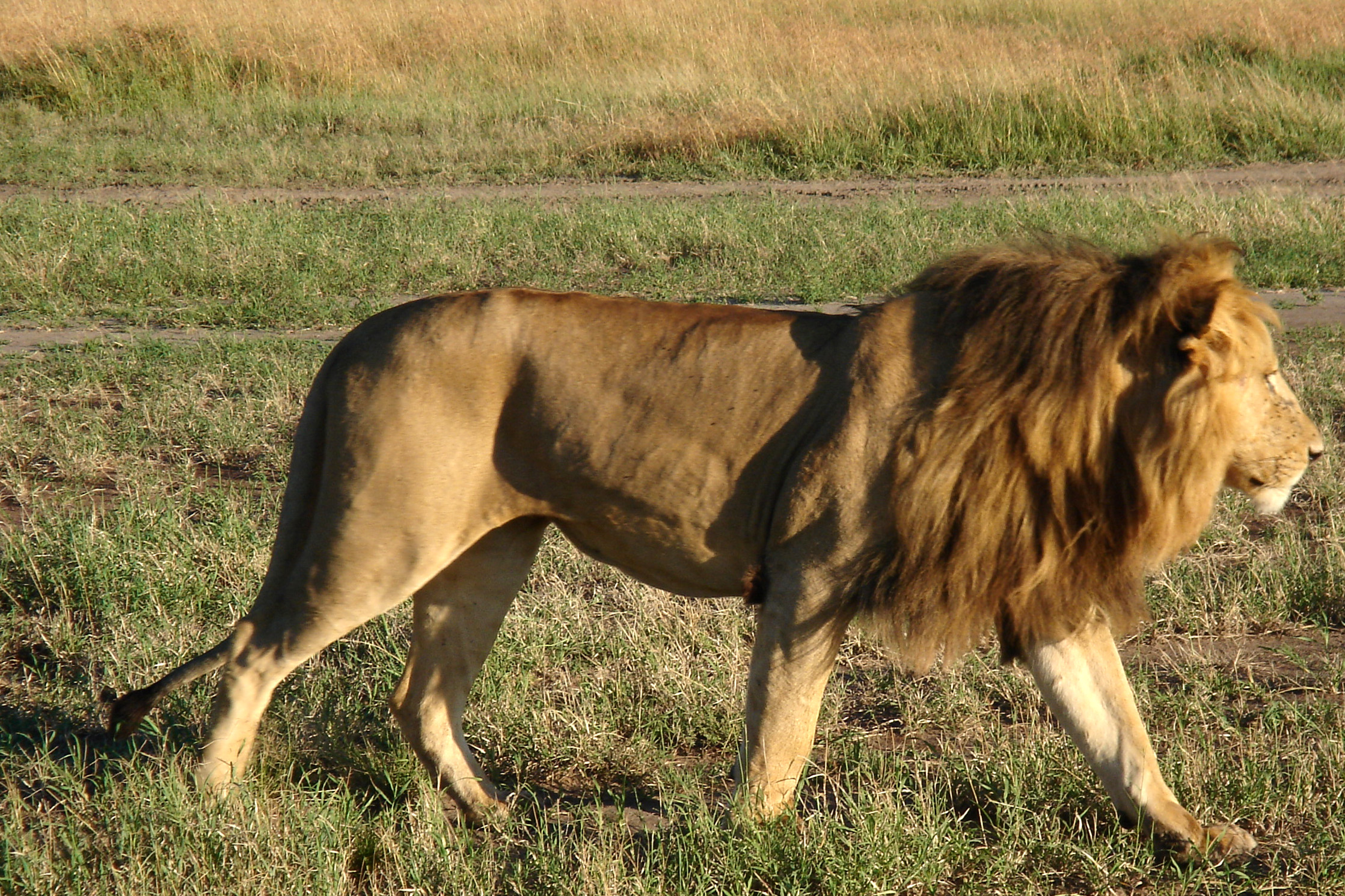
National Zoological Gardens of Sri Lanka
