= Dehiwala East Grama Niladhari Division =

Dehiwala East
- Grama Niladhari Division
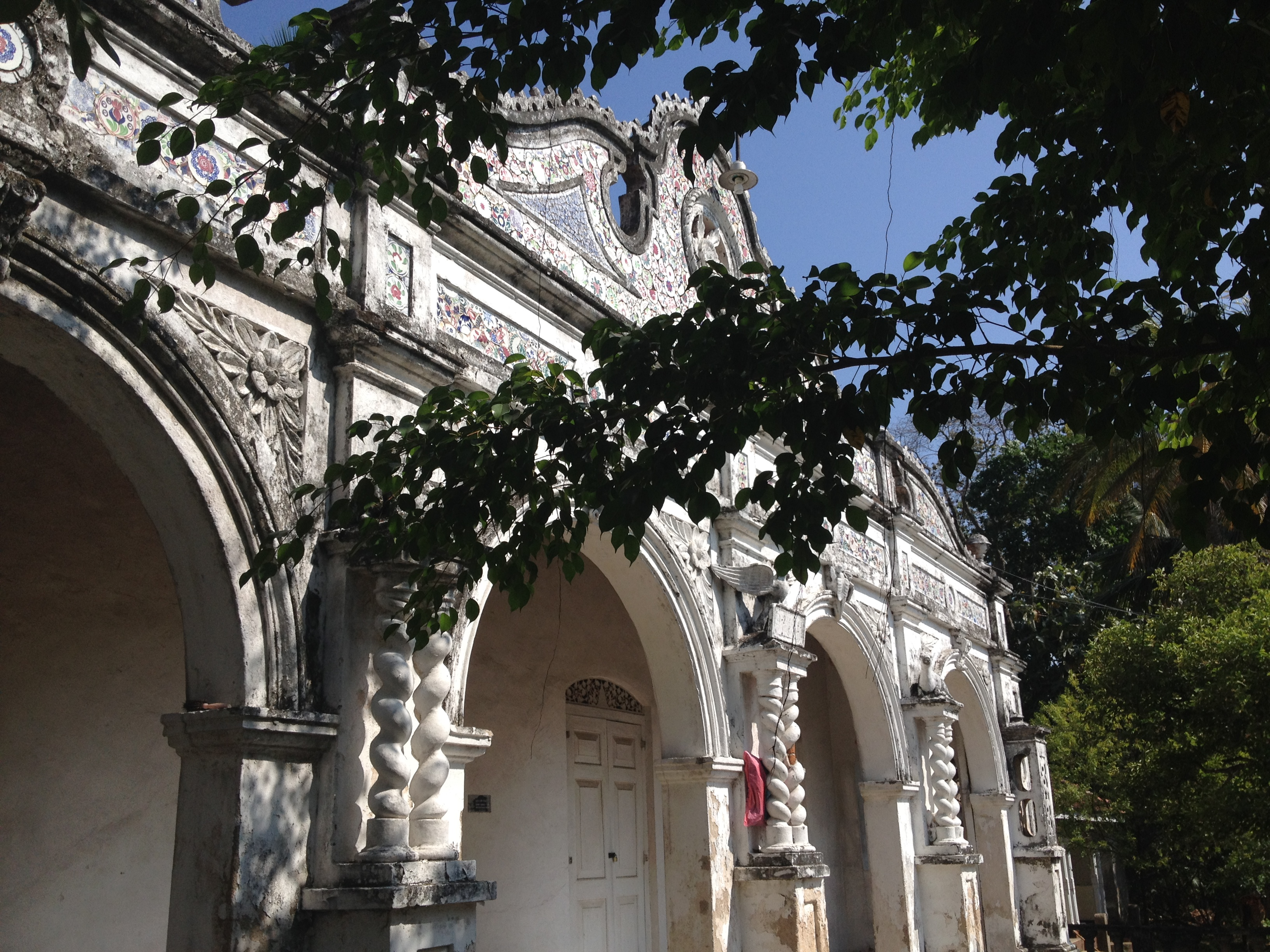
- Coordinates: 6.856035°N 79.869243°E
- Country: Sri Lanka
- Province: Western Province
- District: Colombo District
- Divisional Secretariat: Dehiwala Divisional Secretariat
- Electoral District: Colombo Electoral District
- Polling Division: Dehiwala Polling Division

Area
  - Total: 0.52 km^{2} (0.20 sq mi)
- Elevation: 19 m (62 ft)

Population (2012)
  - Total: 6,767
  - Density: 13,013/km^{2} (33,700/sq mi)
- ISO 3166 code: LK-1130045

Dehiwala East

Dehiwala East Grama Niladhari Division is a Grama Niladhari Division of the Dehiwala Divisional Secretariat of Colombo District of Western Province, Sri Lanka. It has Grama Niladhari Division Code 540.

National Zoological Gardens of Sri Lanka, Sri Subodharama Raja Maha Vihara and Christ Church, Galkissa are located within, nearby or associated with Dehiwala East.

Dehiwala East is a surrounded by the Udyanaya, Malwatta, Jayathilaka, Dehiwala West and Galwala Grama Niladhari Divisions.

== Demographics ==
=== Ethnicity ===
The Dehiwala East Grama Niladhari Division has a Sinhalese majority (52.6%), a significant Moor population (23.0%) and a significant Sri Lankan Tamil population (20.9%). In comparison, the Dehiwala Divisional Secretariat (which contains the Dehiwala East Grama Niladhari Division) has a Sinhalese majority (60.5%), a significant Moor population (20.8%) and a significant Sri Lankan Tamil population (14.5%)

Ethnicity in Dehiwala East
1. Sinhalese (52.6%)
2. Moor (23.0%)
3. Sri Lankan Tamil (20.9%)
4. Other (2.00%)
5. Burgher (1.60%)

=== Religion ===
The Dehiwala East Grama Niladhari Division has a Buddhist plurality (46.7%), a significant Muslim population (24.0%) and a significant Hindu population (17.0%). In comparison, the Dehiwala Divisional Secretariat (which contains the Dehiwala East Grama Niladhari Division) has a Buddhist majority (54.3%), a significant Muslim population (22.6%) and a significant Hindu population (12.1%)

Religion in Dehiwala East
1. Buddhist (46.7%)
2. Muslim (24.0%)
3. Hindu (17.0%)
4. Roman Catholic (8.60%)
5. Other Christian (3.60%)
6. Other (0.10%)

== Gallery ==
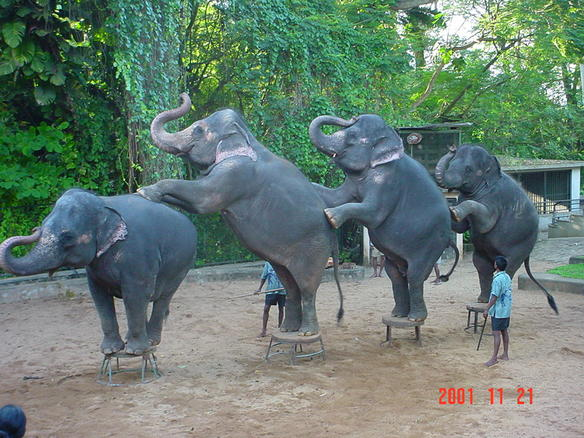
National Zoological Gardens of Sri Lanka

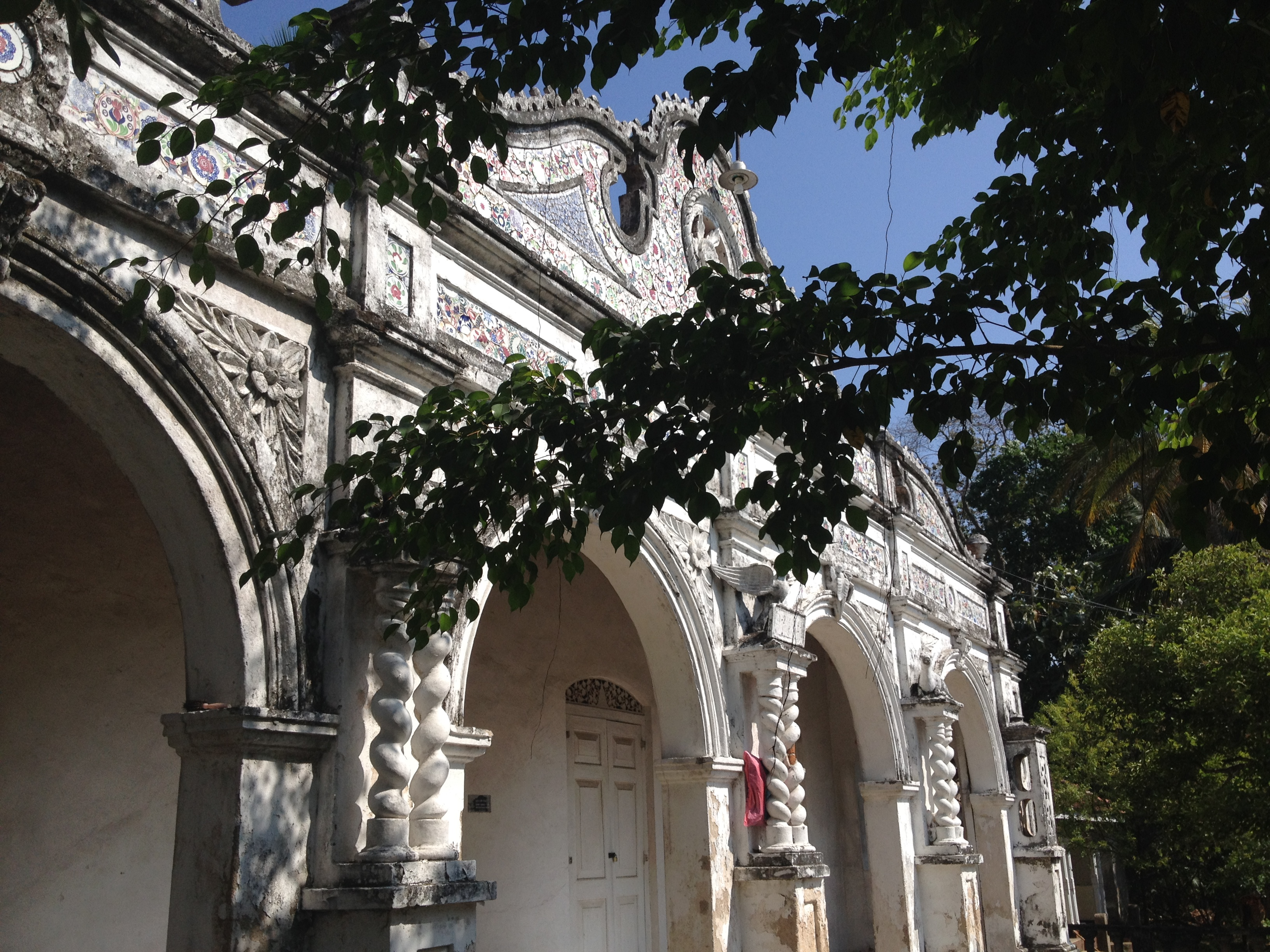
Sri Subodharama Raja Maha Vihara

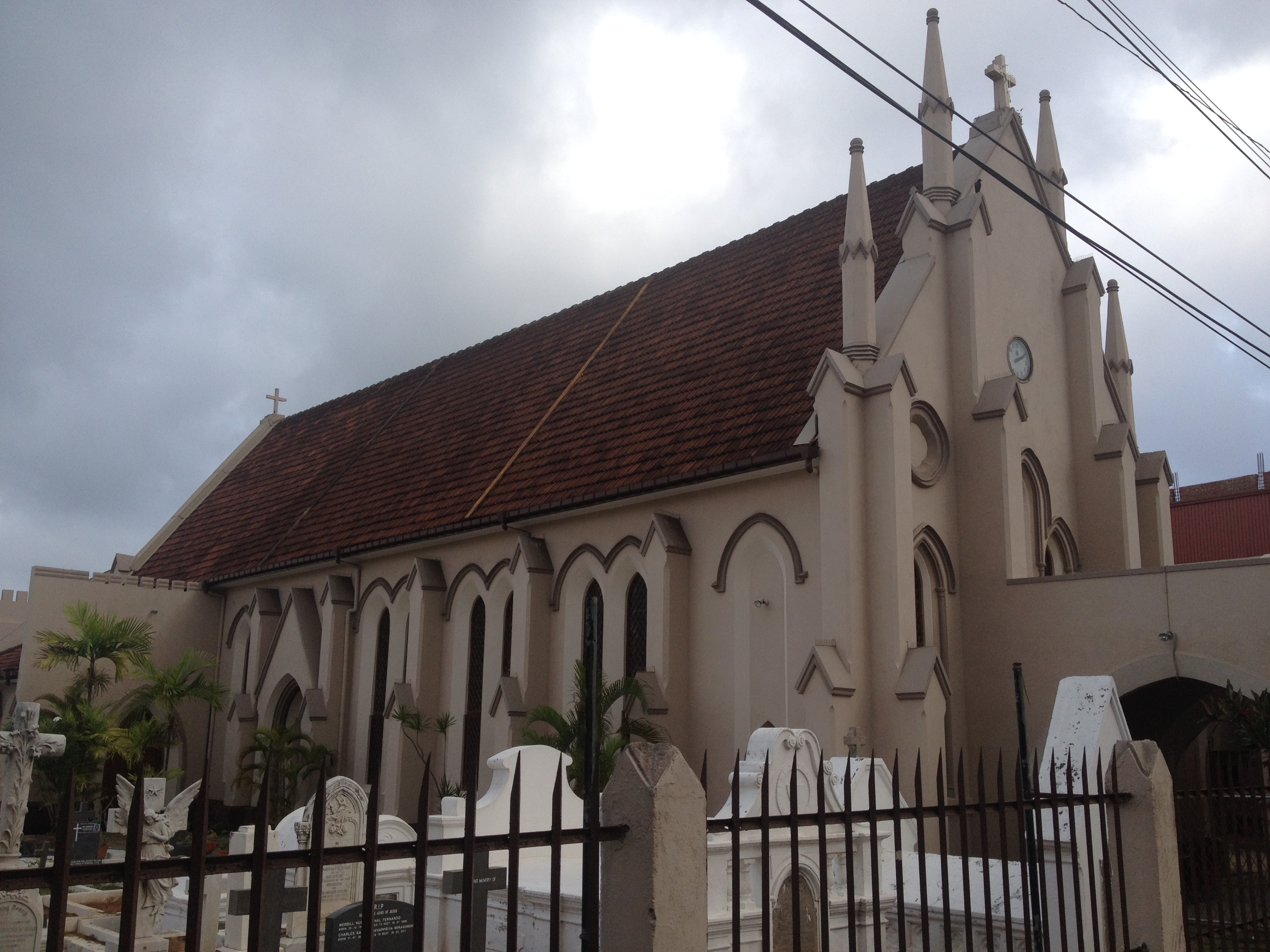
Christ Church, Galkissa
