= Christ Church, Galkissa =

Church in Sri Lanka

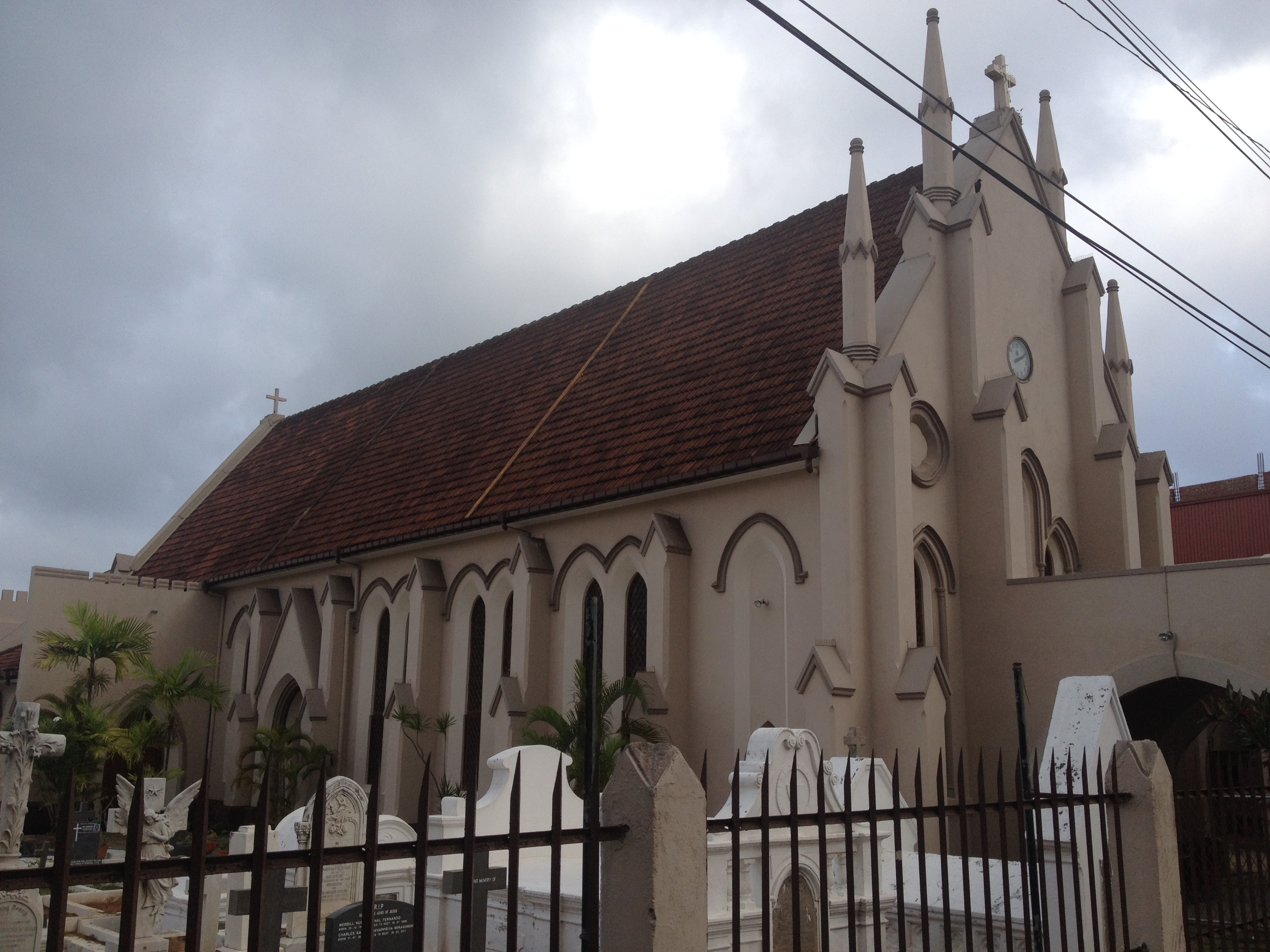
- The church and its graveyard

Religion
- Affiliation: Anglican
- Status: Active

Location
- Location: Dehiwala-Mount Lavinia, Sri Lanka
- Interactive map of Christ Church, Galkissa
- Coordinates: 06°50′54.3″N 79°51′56.3″E

Architecture
- Type: Church
- Completed: 1843

Website
- Christ Church Galkissa (Dehiwela)

Christ Church, (also known as the Church of the Open Door) is an Anglican church in Dehiwala-Mount Lavinia in Sri Lanka. The church is located on Colombo-Galle main road (A2) approximately 0.35 km (0.22 mi) away from the Dehiwala junction. It was consecrated on 16 February 1843. The four tombs within the church's graveyard have been formally recognised by the Government as archaeological protected monuments in Sri Lanka. The designation was declared on 6 June 2008 under the government Gazette number 1553.

== History ==
According to the account of the historian Valentyn, the first reference to a church in Galkissa is in 1705 where it mentions about a church, roofed with tiles and built upon 10 masonry and 20 stone pillars with a wall of clay 3½ft high. The stone pillars which had used for the church are said to be brought from a temple at Pepiliyana. In 1803, during the British rule it is said that there was a church in Galkissa without a roof but with supporting pillars. At that time the country residence of Governor Sir Robert Brownrigg was with the proximity of the Church at Mount-Lavinia and he (the governor) evinced a personal interest to restore the church again in 1820. The consecration of the restored church was held on 16 February 1843 by the Bishop of Madras, George Spencer. The church which was mentioned during the British time period is believed to be the same church described by the historian Valentyn in 1705.

Christ Church, Galkissa is known as the only open door church in Sri Lanka. Since 1952 the door of the church is open for whole of the day and night.

== See also ==
- Christianity in Sri Lanka
