= Dehiwala-Mount Lavinia =

Dehiwala-Mount Lavinia දෙහිවල-ගල්කිස්ස தெஹிவளை-கல்கிசை
- Suburb
- Colombo Metropolitan Region
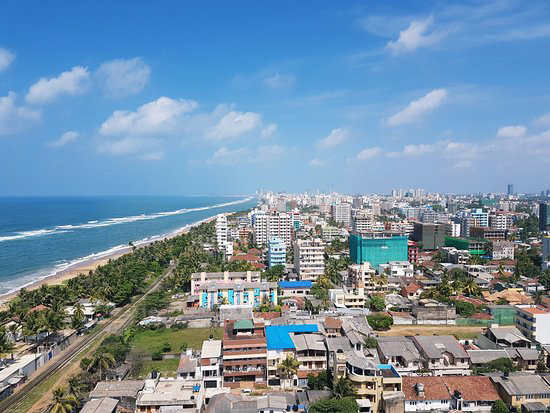
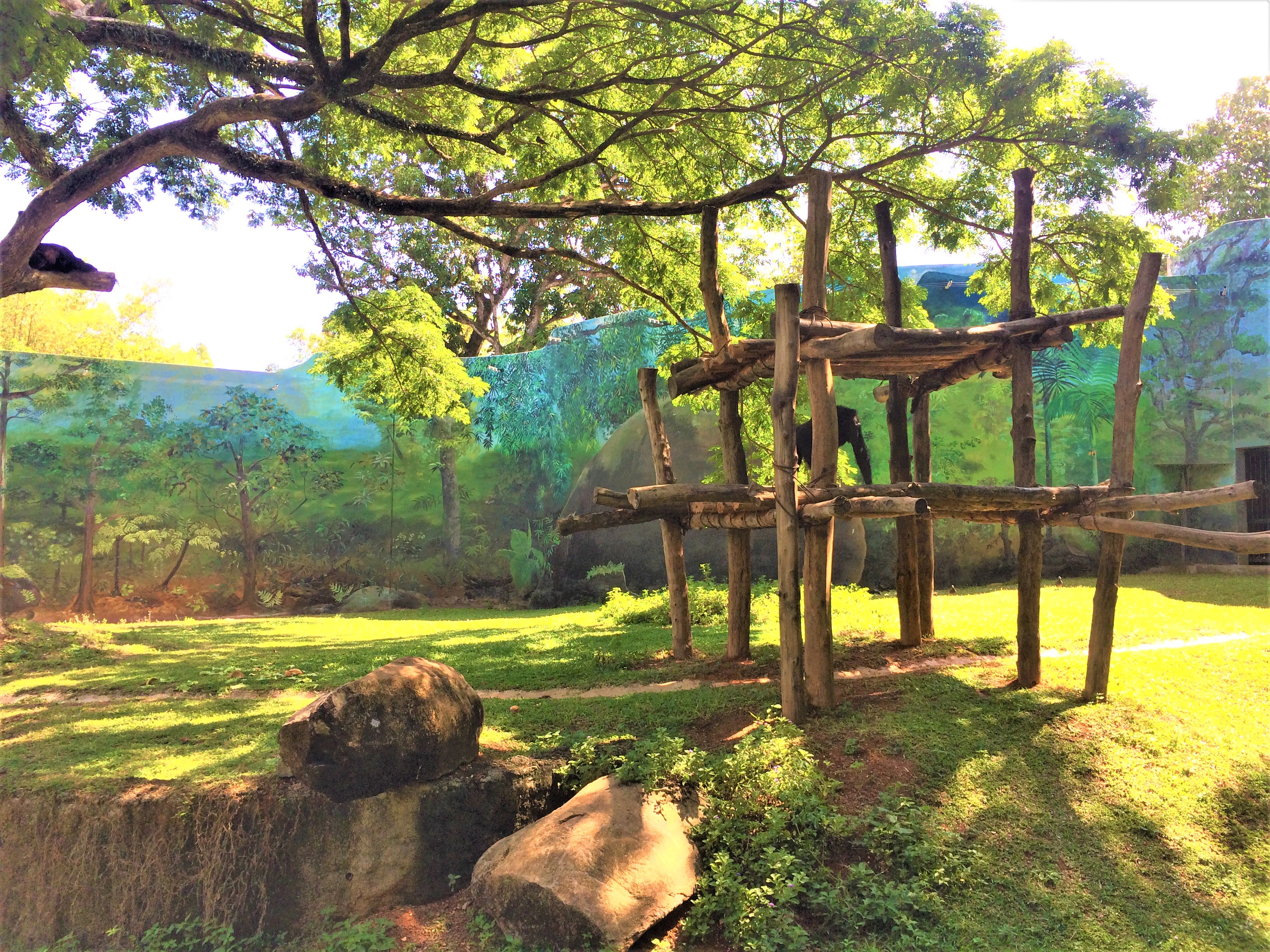
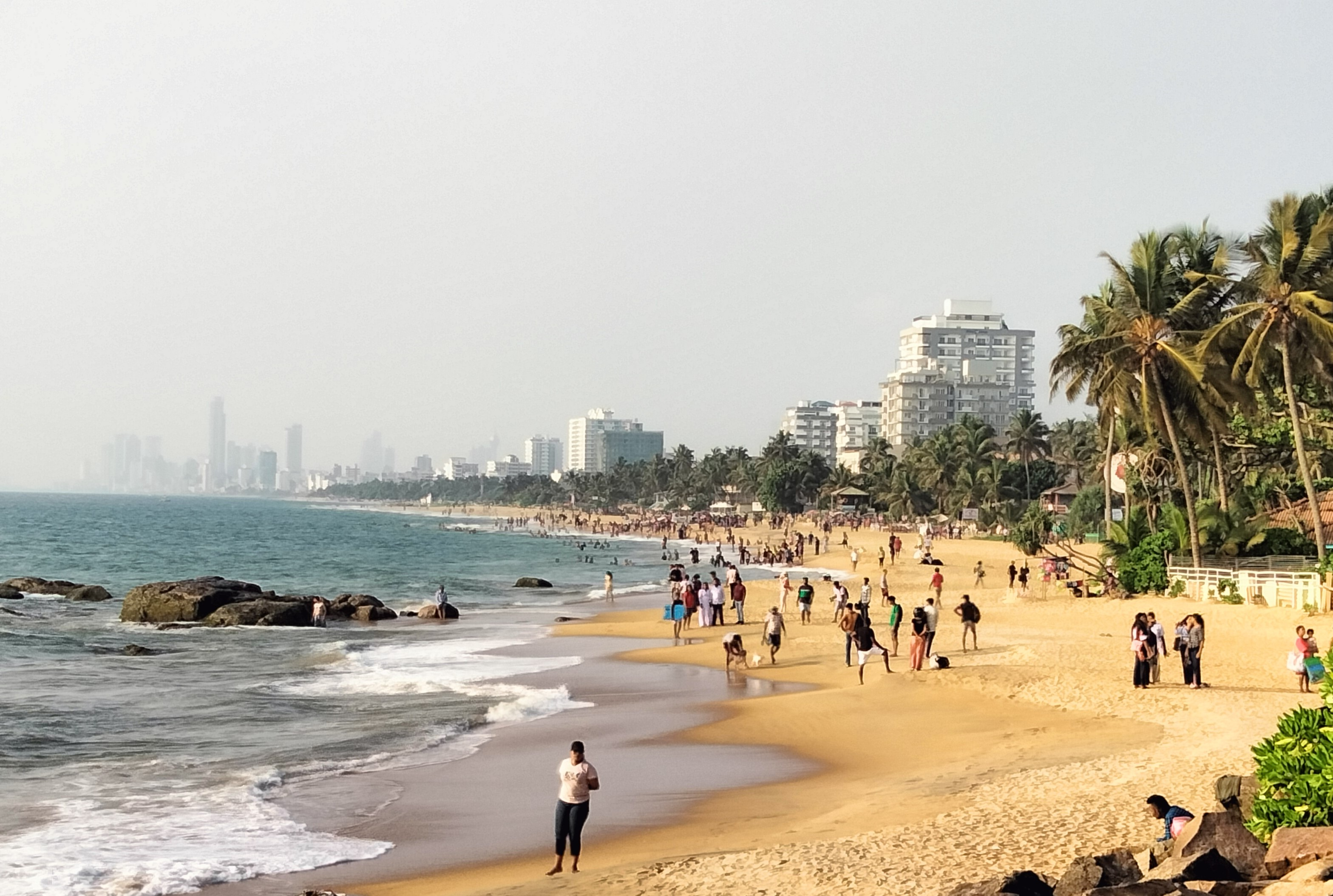
- Dehiwala skyline National Zoological Gardens of Sri Lanka Dehiwala-Mount Lavinia Beach
- Motto: Think differently and hope for the best!
- Location within Colombo District
- Coordinates: 6°52′23″N 79°52′33″E
- Country: Sri Lanka
- Province: Western Province
- District: Colombo District

Government
  - Municipal Council: Dehiwala-Mount Lavinia Municipal Council
  - Headquarters: DMMC – Dehiwala
  - Mayor: Stanley Dias (SLPP)

Area
  - Total: 21.09 km^{2} (8.14 sq mi)
- Elevation: 1 m (3.3 ft)

Population (2012)
  - Total: 245,974
  - Density: 11,663/km^{2} (30,210/sq mi)
- Time zone: UTC+5:30 (SLST)
- Postal code: 10350 (Dehiwala) / 10370 (Mt Lavinia)
- Area code: 011
- Website: dmmc.lk

Dehiwala-Mount Lavinia (Sinhala: දෙහිවල-ගල්කිස්ස, romanized: Dehivala-Galkissa; Tamil: தெஹிவளை-கல்கிசை, romanized: Tehivaḷai-Kalkicai), population 245,974 (2012), is a large municipality in Sri Lanka, covering 2,109 ha (5,210 acres). It lies south of the Colombo Municipal Council area and is separated from it by the Dehiwala canal which forms the northern boundary of DMMC. Its southern limits lie in Borupana Road and the eastern boundary is Weras Ganga with its canal system and it includes some areas to its east (Pepiliyana, Gangodawila and Kohuwala). This town has experienced extensive population growth and rapid industrialisation and urbanisation in recent years. It is home to Sri Lanka's National Zoological Gardens, which remains one of Asia's largest. Colombo South Teaching Hospital, Kalubowila and Colombo Airport, Ratmalana are some important landmarks in this area. Dehiwela-Mount Lavinia and Sri Jayawardenapura Kotte being two large suburban centres of the city of Colombo function together as one large urban agglomeration in the Region (Western Province). The overspill from the City in residential and commercial uses of land has rapidly urbanised these suburban centres. Dehiwela-Mount Lavinia and Sri Jayawardenpaura along with Colombo Municipal Council form the most urbanised part of the core area of the Colombo Metropolitan Region. Dehiwala and Mount Lavinia lie along the Galle Road artery, which runs along the coast to the south of the country.

== Etymology ==
There are many stories about the history of this area. One of those is Diya Wala which means a dip or hole filled with water. In the past this area was full of ponds and lakes; thus it became known as Diyawala (an area filled with water) and later on it became Dehiwala. Another story in regard to this name is that this area has many lime trees or a forest of lime trees and people called it Dehiwala. It is said that the king of Kotte filled all his lime requirements from this area.

== History ==
Before colonisation of the maritime region by the Portuguese, the area covered by the present DMMC was part of the Kingdom of Kotte. It comprised a number of villages such as Pepiliyana Nedimala, Attidiya and Kalubowila, while Ratmalana and areas south of Dehiwala were together one large expanse of marshland, and scarcely populated.

== Geography ==
As the Dehiwala-Mount Lavinia area lies on the coastal plain the land is mostly flat and undulating towards the inland areas. A significant feature is the large extent of wetlands around the Weras Ganga (river) and Bolgoda Lake, the two major water bodies. The Bellanwila and Attidiya marshes are noteworthy for their biodiversity and as such are considered as an ecological protected zone. Lying in the wet zone, the Dehiwala-Mount Lavinia area receives an average annual rainfall between 2,000–3,000 mm (79–118 in) mainly during the southwest monsoon and the intermonsoon periods. The mean average day temperature is around 28 °C (82 °F) and the average maximum between 30.5 and 31 °C. The minimum night temperature varies from 26 °C to 27 °C.

== Zones ==
Dehiwala-Mount Lavinia is a suburb of Colombo Metropolitan Region. Its Municipality comprises the following areas.

- Dehiwala
- Mount-Lavinia
- Attidiya
- Kalubowila
- Kohuwala
- Nedimala
- Ratmalana

== Demographics ==
Dehiwala-Mount Lavinia Municipality area is a multi-religious, multi-ethnic, multi-cultural city.

Religious & Ethnic Identification in Dehiwala-Mount Lavinia Municipality area
Denomination	2012	Percentage
Religion
Buddhist	111,330	60.84%
Islam	29,928	16.35%
Hindu	15,978	8.73%
Roman Catholic	12,726	6.95%
Other Christian	8,250	4.51%
Other	4,784	2.61%
Total	182,996	100.00%
Ethnicity
Sinhalese	128,363	70.15%
Sri Lankan Moor	26,875	14.69%
Sri Lankan Tamil	20,769	11.35%
Burgher	2,609	1.43%
Indian Tamil	2,095	1.14%
Malay	1,102	0.60%
Other	964	0.53%
Sri Lankan Chetty	139	0.08%
Baratha	80	0.04%
Total	182,996	100.00%

== Places of worship ==
=== Buddhist temples ===
- Bellanwila Rajamaha Viharaya is a Buddhist temple situated in Bellanwila, Colombo District, Sri Lanka. Located around 12 km south of Colombo, near Dehiwala–Maharagama road, the temple attracts hundreds of devotees daily and is famous for its annual Esala Perehera festival which usually takes place in the month of August or September. One of the most venerated Buddhist temples in Sri Lanka.
- Nawa Polonnaru Gal Viharaya – Kanumuldeniye Sri Dharmashoka Thero, the construction of replicas of all the statues of the Gal Viharaya, Polonnaruwa that started in 1982, has now been completed. The opening of the Samadhi Buddha statue coincides with the 2,600 Sambuddhatwa Jayanthi celebrations. Those Buddha statues are constructed at the Nawa Polonnaru Gal Viahraya, Dehiwala following the original scale of the statue at the Gal Viharaya, Polonnaruwa and were declared open by Former President Mahinda Rajapaksa.

=== Hindu temples ===
- Sri Nandeeshwaram kovil ( ancient Lord Shiva Temple), Economic Center road, Rathmalana.( Behind the Railway Work shop ) Total distance from road to Kovil 2.0 km (1.2 mi). The Ancient Temple in which the great kind of Lanka Ravana worshiped Lora Shiva, was destroyed by Dutch almost 500 years ago. The present temples was built in 1984 and is popularly known as " Gona Kovil", Gona in Sinhala means bull. The Banayan Tree ( ஆலமரம்/ නුග ගස) at the temple premises is also over 500 years.
- Sithi Vinayagar kovil at Rathmalana Hindu college, Borupana Road, Rathmalana. It is about 500 m (1,600 ft) from the Galle Road.
- Sri Venkateshwara Maha Vishnu Moorthy Kovil is next to Nedimala and is located in Dehiwala.
- Sri Anjaneyar Kovil is located in the Dehiwala-Mount Lavinia area of Colombo. It is about 30–45 minutes from the main area of Colombo.
- Sri Muthumari Amman Thiru Kovil, Abeysekara Rd Dehiwala-Mount Lavinia, Total distance main road from to Kovil 802.89 m (2,634.2 ft)
- Shiva Sakthi Karumariamman Kovil, 3rd stage, Badowita (off Abeysekera Place ) Total distance from main road to Kovil 2.0 km (1.2 mi)

=== Churches ===
- St. Mary's Church – On 13 September 1834, six Catholic laymen from the congregation of St. Sylvester's church, now St. Anthony's Church, Galkissa came to Dehiwala in search of a piece of land to build a church. A devout Catholic, Muhandiram B. Bastian Mendis gifted them 0.20 ha (0.5 acres) of land. The foundation stone was laid and on 4 February 1835 the church was consecrated to Our Lady of Good Voyage, says one of the Jubilee Secretaries Nigel de Lile.
- Christ Church, Galkissa – According to the historian Valentyn, the earliest reference to a church in Galkissa is in 1705 when there was a pretty good church, roofed with tiles and built upon 10 masonry and 20 stone pillars, taken from the heathen temple of Pepiliyana with a wall of clay 1.1 m (3.5 ft) high. With the main entrance from Galle Road, when the Rev. Felix Dias Abeysinghe was vicar, the main door of the church was opened, never to be closed again on 6 June 1959, and Christ Church, Galkissa became the “Church of the open door.”

== Government and law enforcement ==
Dehiwala-Mount Lavinia is a suburb of the Colombo Metropolitan Area, with a Municipal Council form of government. Dehiwala-Mount Lavinia's mayor and the council members are elected through local government elections held once every five years. The city government provides sewer, road management and waste management services, water, electricity and telephone utility services. The council liaises with the road development authority, water supply and drainage board, the Ceylon electricity board and telephone service providers.

There are 2 Divisional Secretaries in the Dehiwala-Mount Lavinia area

- Dehiwala Divisional Secretariat
- Ratmalana Divisional Secretariat

The Sri Lanka Police, the main law enforcement agency of the island, liaise with the municipal council, but is under the control of the Ministry of Defence of the central government. As with most Sri Lankan cities, the magistrate court handles felony crimes, the district court handles civil cases. There are 3 police stations within the Dehiwala-Mount Lavinia area

- Dehiwala Police Station
- Mount Lavinia Police Station
- Kohuwala Police Station

== Transport ==
=== Bus ===
Colombo has an extensive public transport system based on buses operated by both private operators and the government-owned Sri Lanka Transport Board (SLTB). The primary bus terminals within the Dehiwala-Mount Lavinia — Dehiwala Bus Terminal, Mount Lavinia Bus Terminal and Ratmalana Bus Terminal — handle local services.

=== Rail ===
There are three railway stations in Dehiwala-Mount Lavinia: Dehiwala (12 km (7.5 mi) from Colombo-Fort), Mount Lavinia (14.2 km (8.8 mi)) and Ratmalana (16 km (9.9 mi)). Train transport in the city is limited since most trains are meant for transport to and from Colombo rather than within the city itself and are often overcrowded. Few express trains stop at Mount Lavinia Station. Dehiwala-Mount Lavinia is situated on the Coastal Line of Sri Lanka Railways, which runs from Colombo towards Matara.

=== Road ===
The road network in Dehiwala and Mount Lavinia consists of three classes of roads. Dehiwala and Mount Lavinia lie along the Galle Road artery in the West of the city, which runs along the coast to the south of the country. It is the gateway to the Colombo Metro City from the Southern part of Sri Lanka.

- A2 highway connects Colombo with Galle and Matara
- B84 highway connects Colombo with Horana
- Hill Street connects Dehiwala With Boralesgamuwa and Maharagama
- Hospital Road connects with Nugegoda
- Marine Drive

=== Air ===
Ratmalana Airport is the city's airport, located 15 km (9.3 mi) south of the Colombo city centre and 2 km (1.2 mi) from Dehiwala junction. It commenced operating in 1935 and was the country's first international airport until it was replaced by Bandaranaike Airport in 1967. Ratmalana Airport now primarily services domestic flights, aviation training and international corporate flights.

=== Other ===
Other means of transport include the taxis. These cab services are run by private companies and are metered.

== Notable residents ==
See Category:People from Dehiwala-Mount Lavinia

== Gallery ==
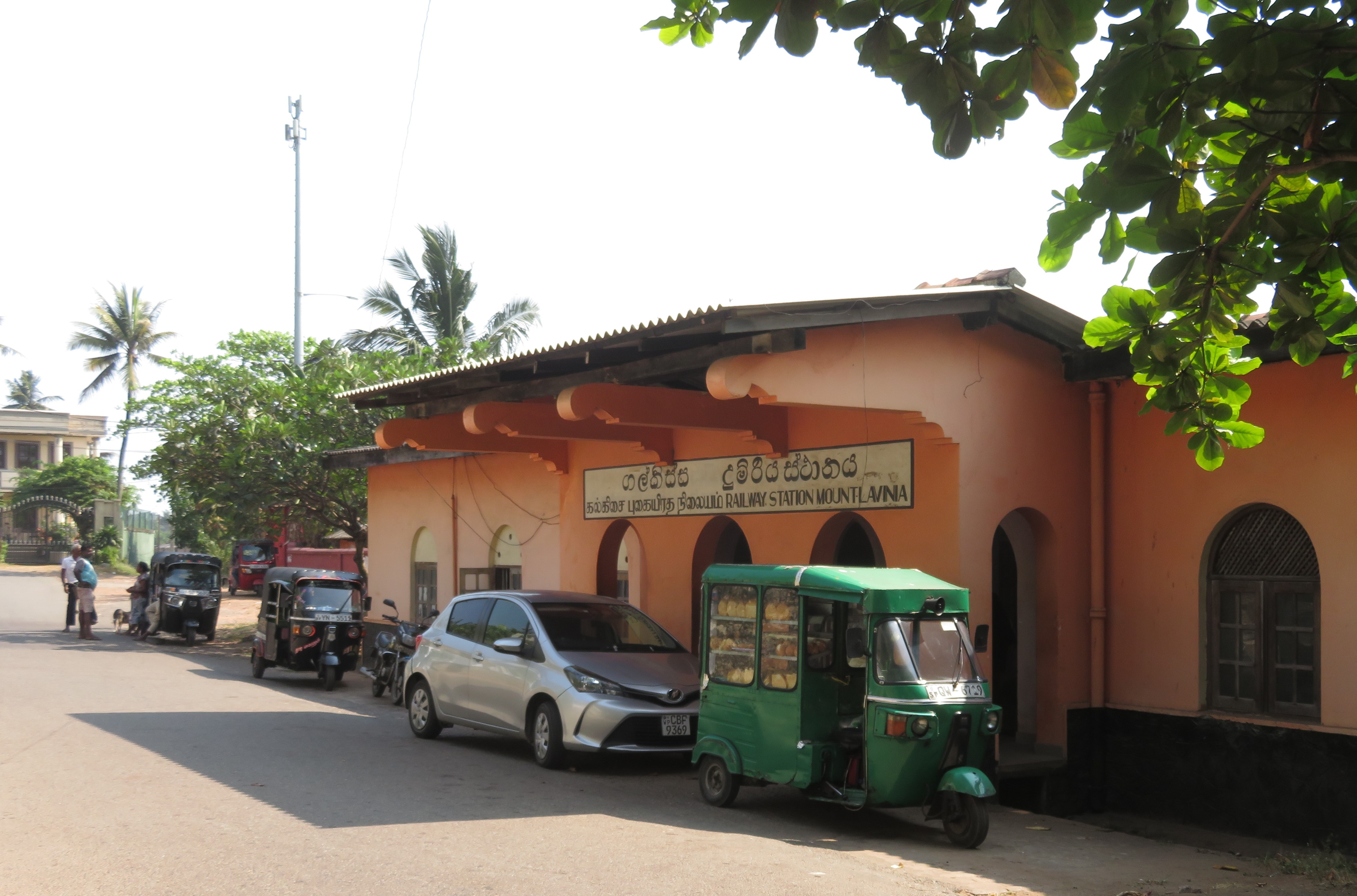
Mount Lavinia Railway Station

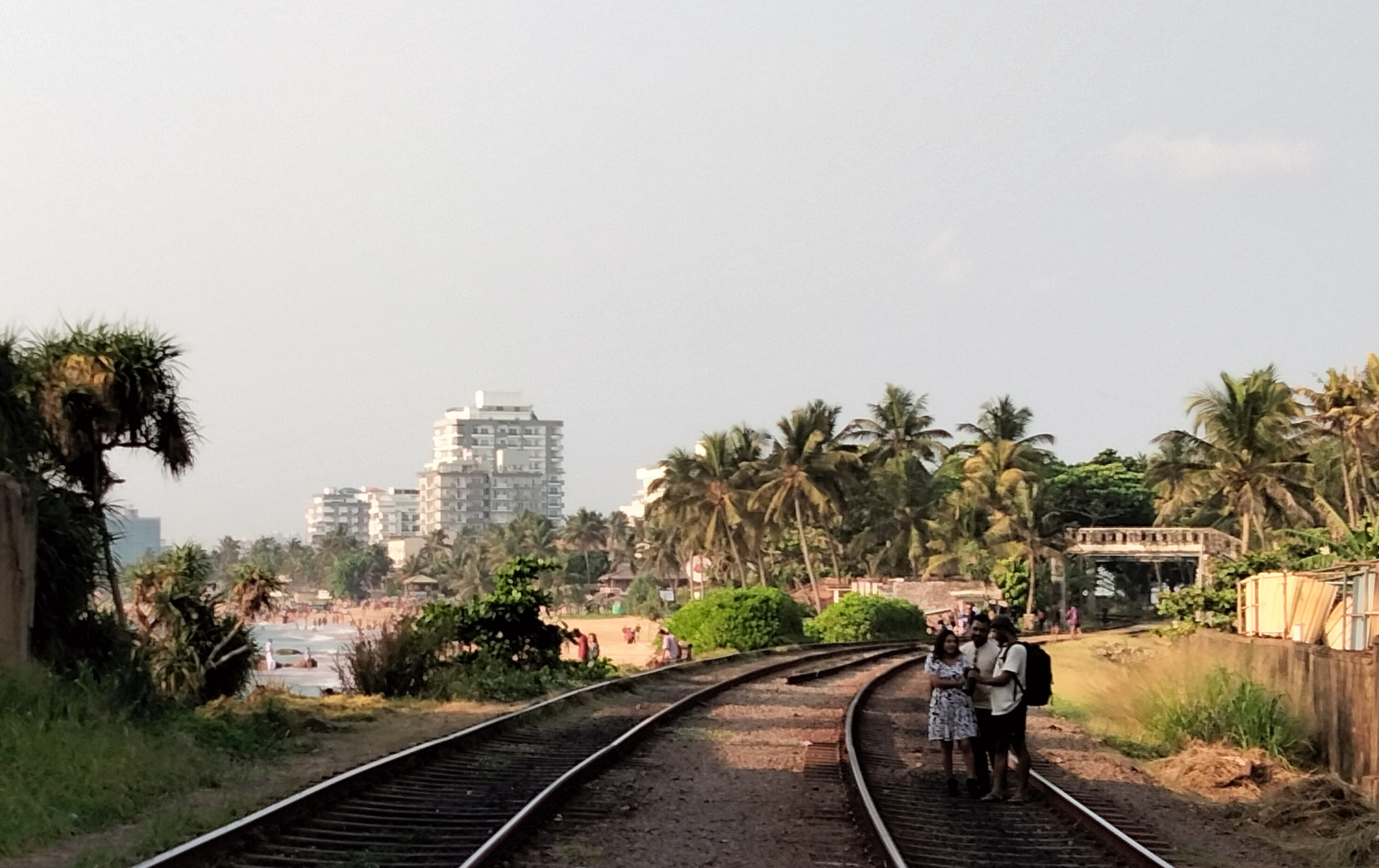
Coastal Line at Mount Lavinia Beach

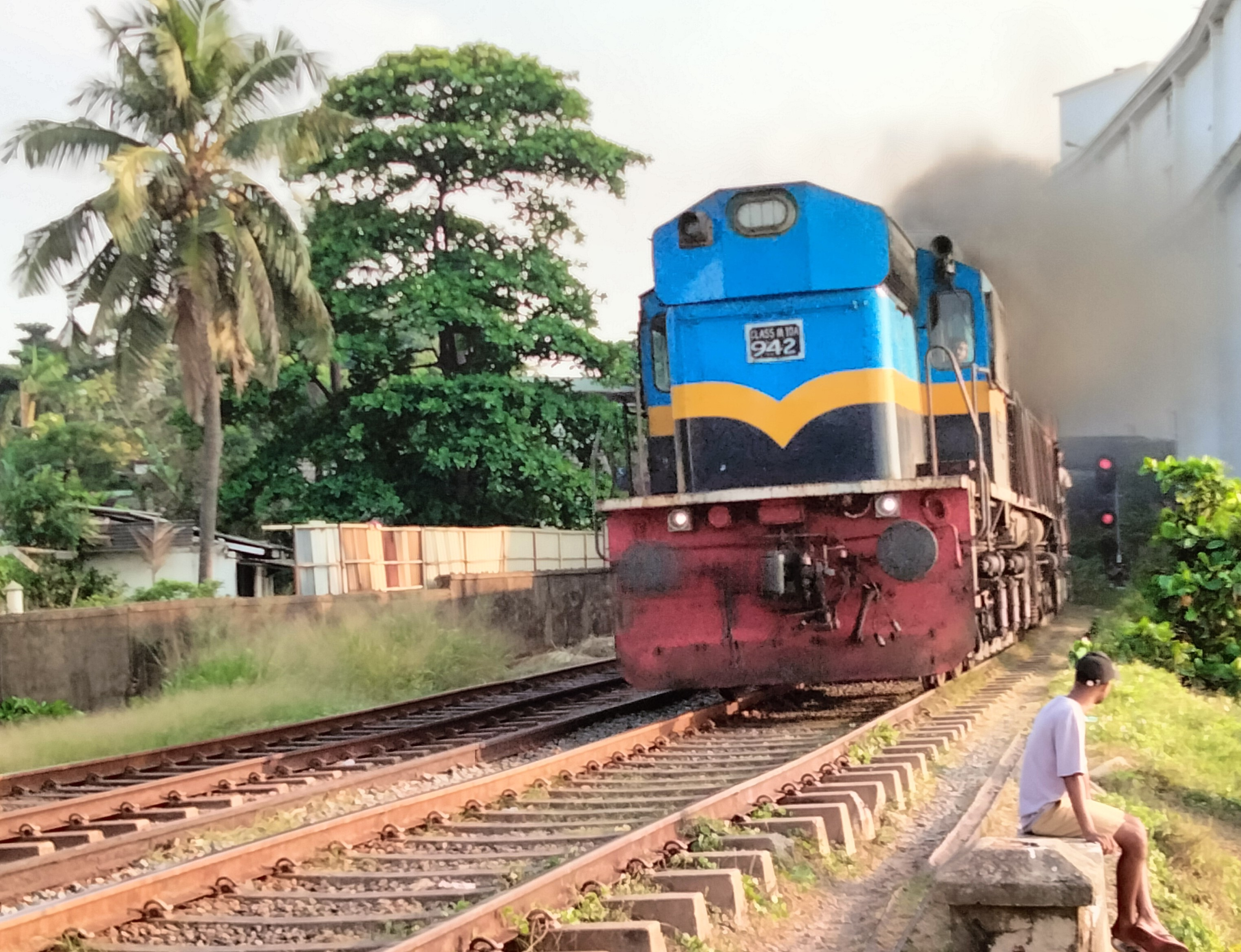
Train at Mount Lavinia Beach

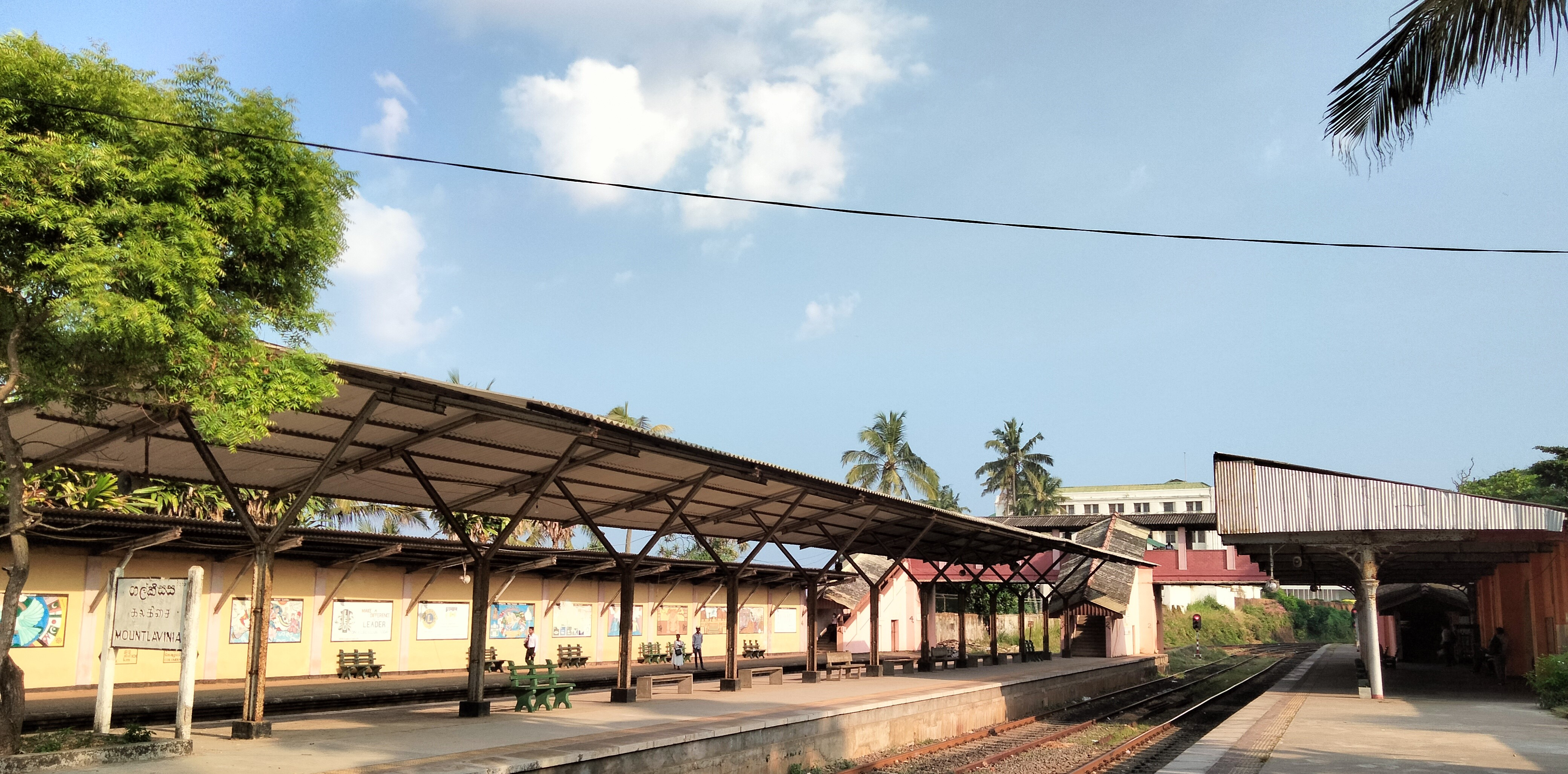
Mount Lavinia Railway Station

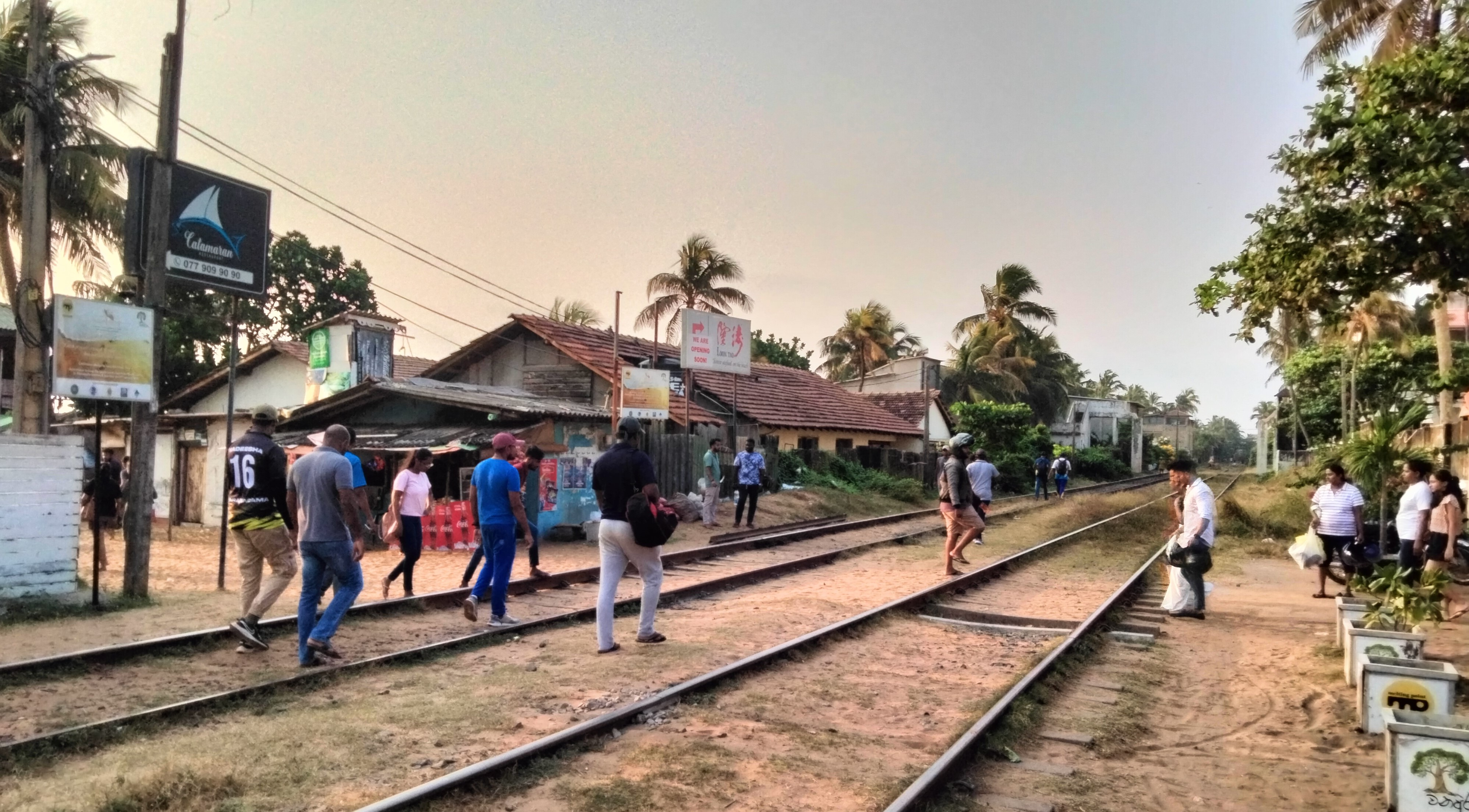
Railway crossing, Galkissa

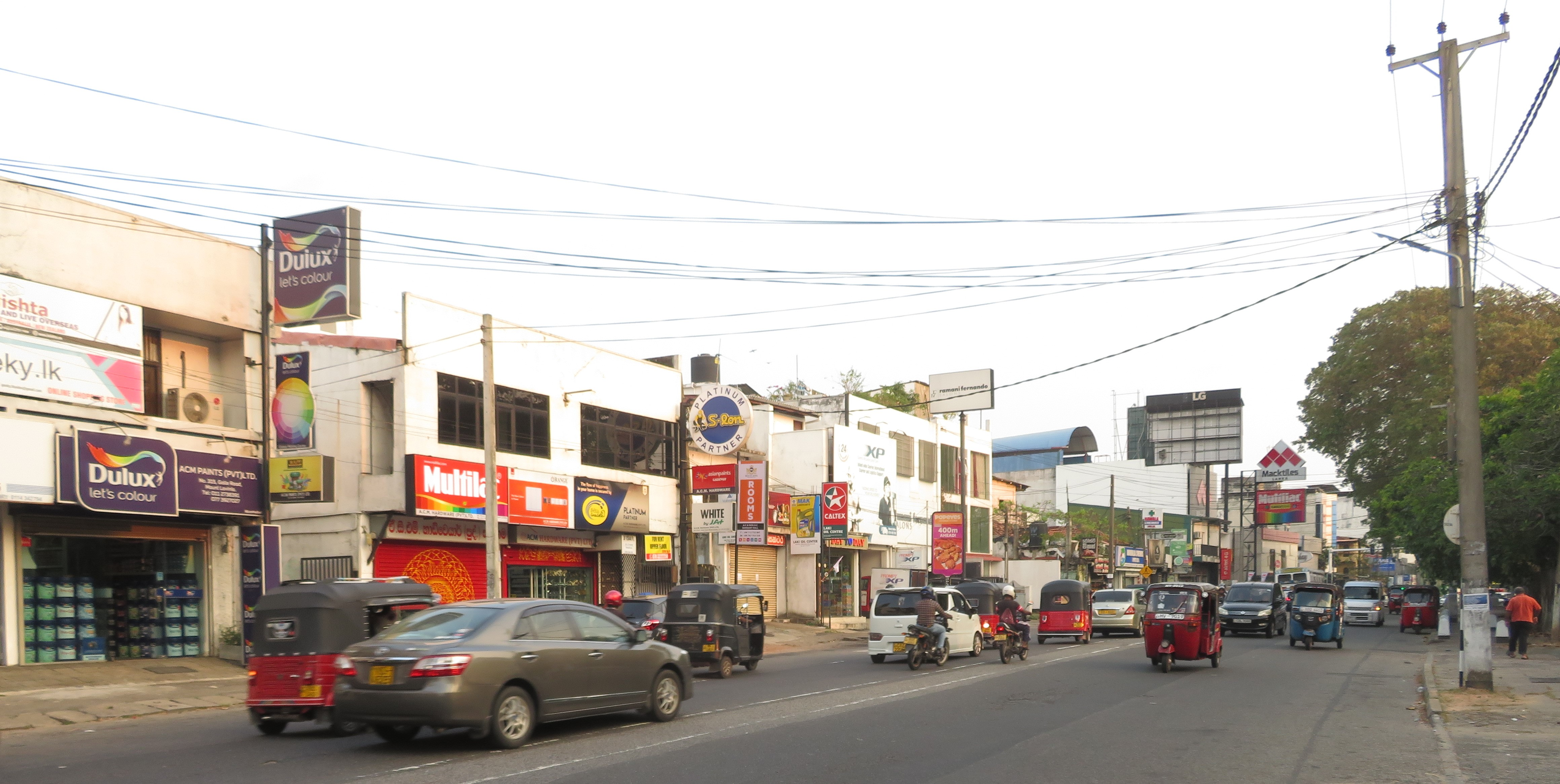
Galle Road, main road of Dehiwala-Mount Lavinia

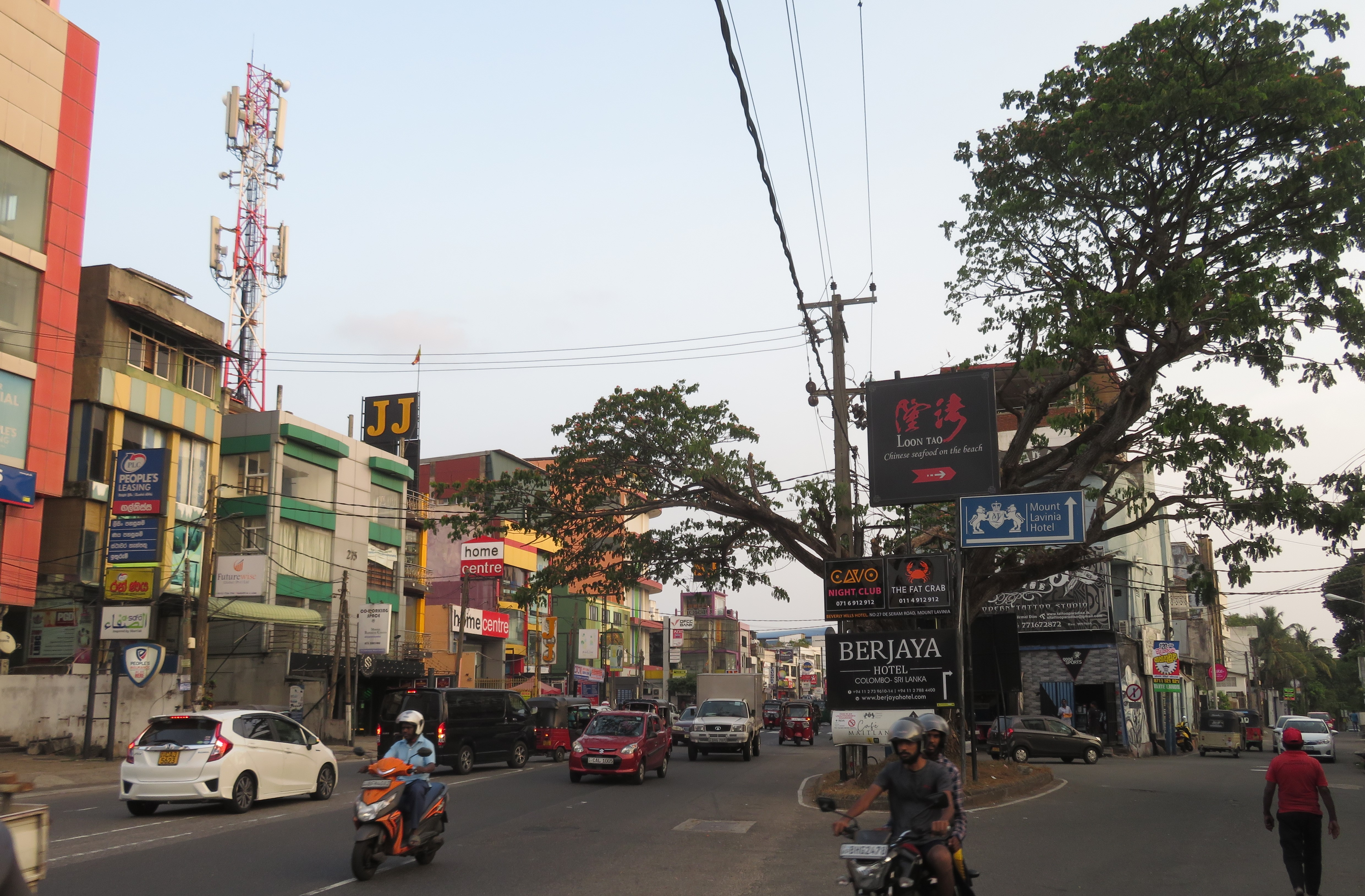
Galle Road

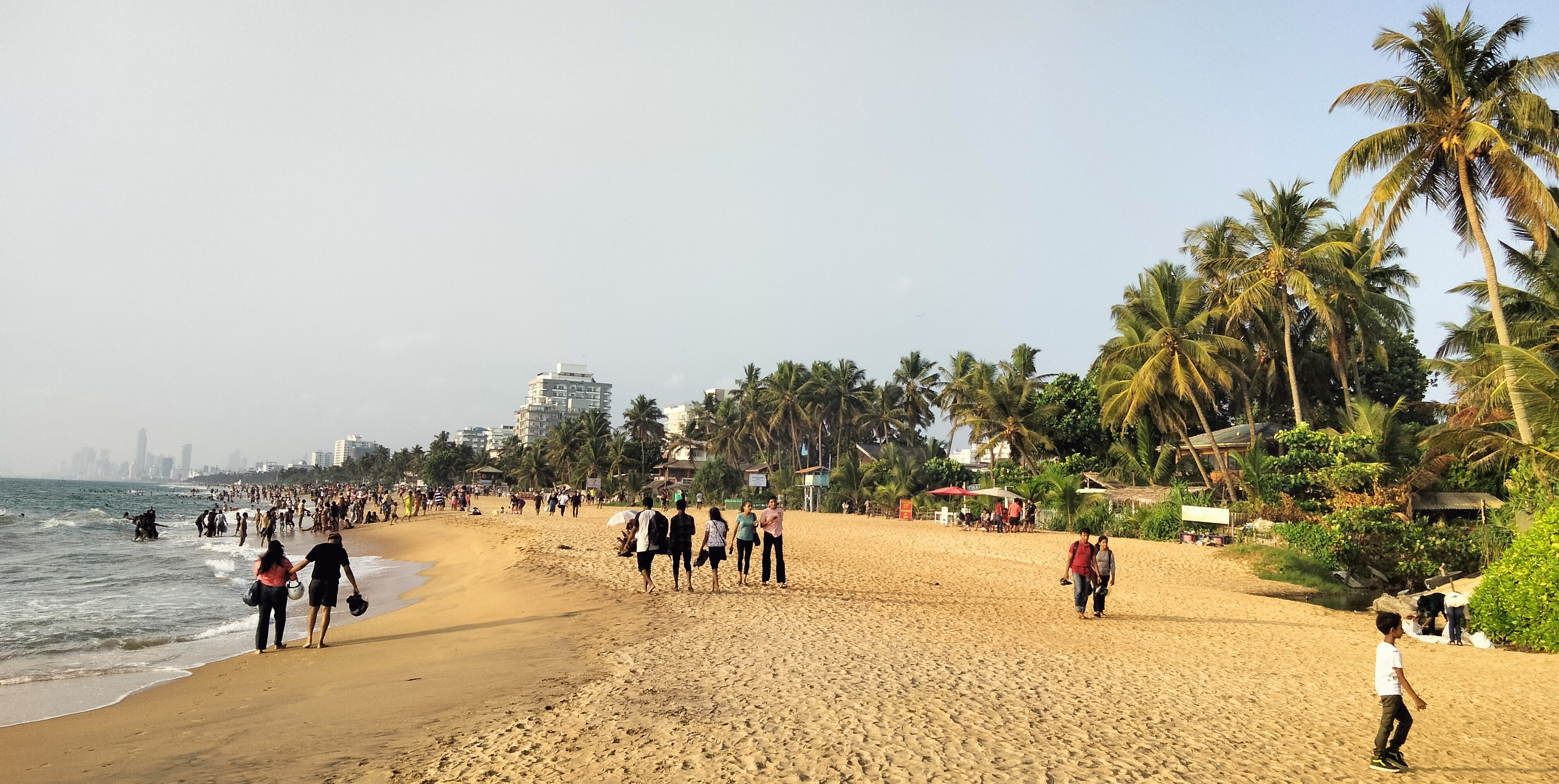
Mount Lavinia Beach

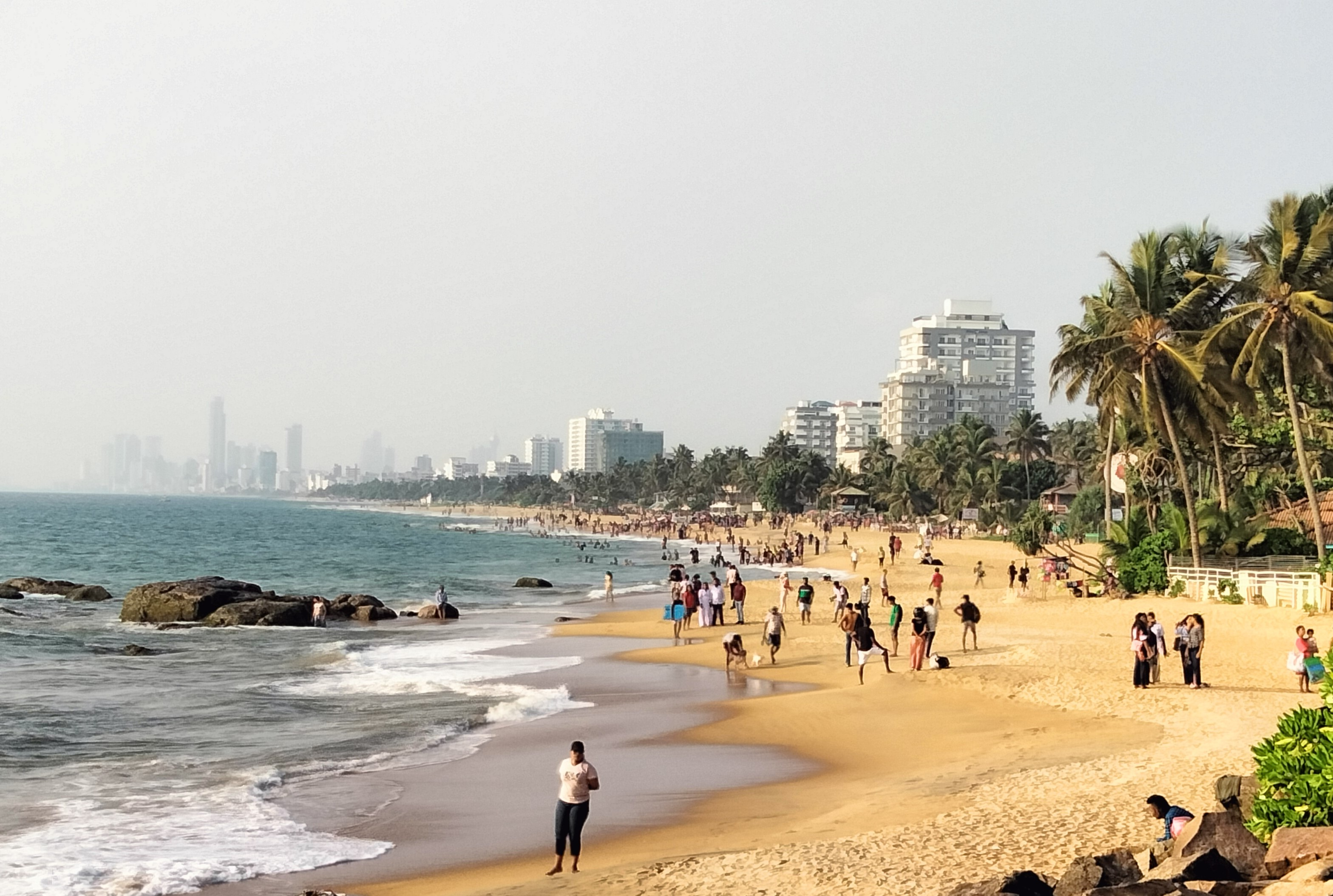
Mount Lavinia Beach, view to Colombo

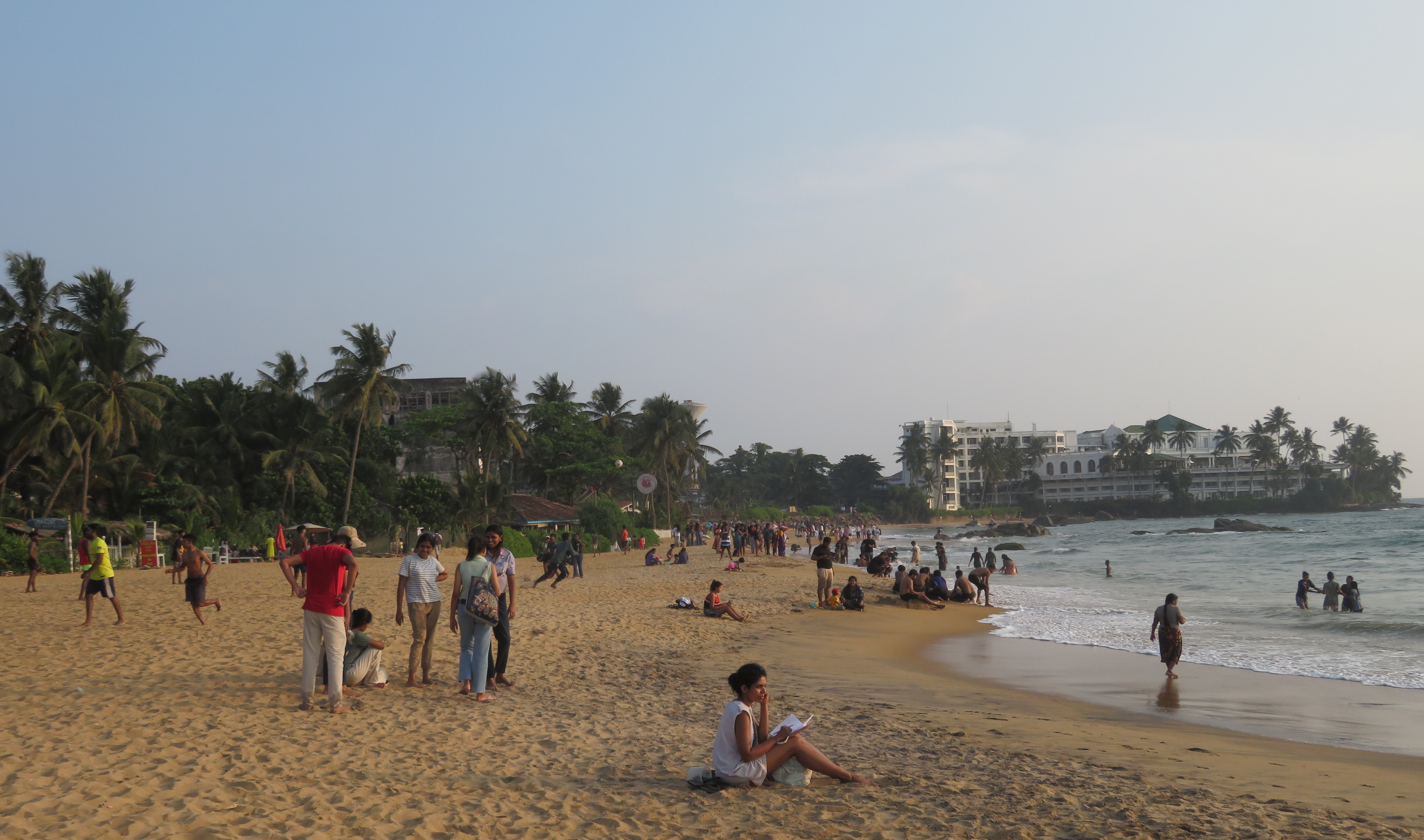
View to Mount Lavinia Hotel
