= Dehiwala West Grama Niladhari Division =

Dehiwala West
- Grama Niladhari Division
- Interactive map of Dehiwala West
- Coordinates: 6.858160°N 79.861970°E
- Country: Sri Lanka
- Province: Western Province
- District: Colombo District
- Divisional Secretariat: Dehiwala Divisional Secretariat
- Electoral District: Colombo Electoral District
- Polling Division: Dehiwala Polling Division

Area
  - Total: 0.59 km^{2} (0.23 sq mi)
- Elevation: 18 m (59 ft)

Population (2012)
  - Total: 5,184
  - Density: 8,786/km^{2} (22,760/sq mi)
- ISO 3166 code: LK-1130040

Dehiwala West

Dehiwala West Grama Niladhari Division is a Grama Niladhari Division of the Dehiwala Divisional Secretariat of Colombo District of Western Province, Sri Lanka. It has Grama Niladhari Division Code 540A.

Dehiwala West is a surrounded by the Dehiwala East, Jayathilaka, Wellawatta South and Galwala Grama Niladhari Divisions.

== Demographics ==
=== Ethnicity ===
The Dehiwala West Grama Niladhari Division has a Sri Lankan Tamil majority (54.8%), a significant Sinhalese population (21.8%) and a significant Moor population (20.2%). In comparison, the Dehiwala Divisional Secretariat (which contains the Dehiwala West Grama Niladhari Division) has a Sinhalese majority (60.5%), a significant Moor population (20.8%) and a significant Sri Lankan Tamil population (14.5%)

Ethnicity in Dehiwala West
1. Sri Lankan Tamil (54.8%)
2. Sinhalese (21.8%)
3. Moor (20.2%)
4. Other (1.90%)
5. Indian Tamil (1.40%)

=== Religion ===
The Dehiwala West Grama Niladhari Division has a Hindu plurality (44.4%), a significant Muslim population (22.5%), a significant Buddhist population (14.1%) and a significant Roman Catholic population (10.7%). In comparison, the Dehiwala Divisional Secretariat (which contains the Dehiwala West Grama Niladhari Division) has a Buddhist majority (54.3%), a significant Muslim population (22.6%) and a significant Hindu population (12.1%)

Religion in Dehiwala West
1. Hindu (44.4%)
2. Muslim (22.5%)
3. Buddhist (14.1%)
4. Roman Catholic (10.7%)
5. Other Christian (8.20%)
6. Other (0.10%)
