= Kawdana East Grama Niladhari Division =

Kawdana East
- Grama Niladhari Division
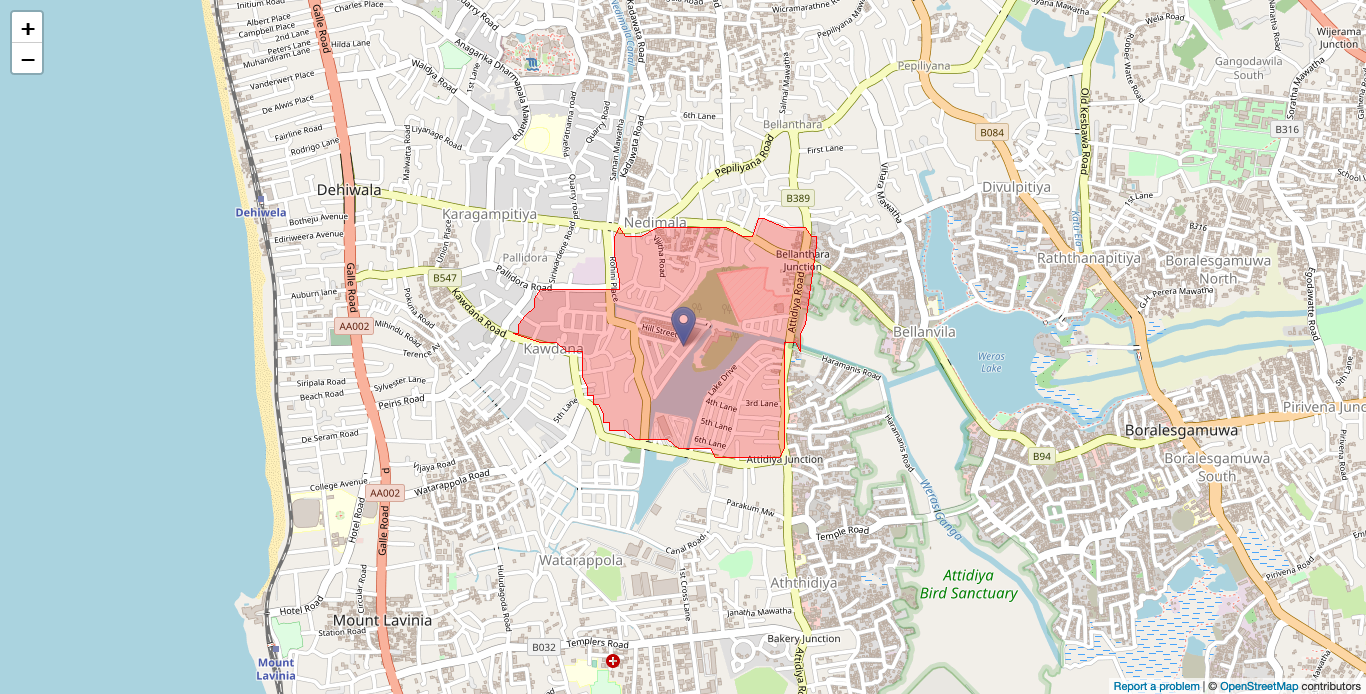
- Coordinates: 6.844584°N 79.880315°E
- Country: Sri Lanka
- Province: Western Province
- District: Colombo District
- Divisional Secretariat: Dehiwala Divisional Secretariat
- Electoral District: Colombo Electoral District
- Polling Division: Dehiwala Polling Division

Area
  - Total: 1.22 km^{2} (0.47 sq mi)
- Elevation: 6 m (20 ft)

Population (2012)
  - Total: 8,091
  - Density: 6,632/km^{2} (17,180/sq mi)
- ISO 3166 code: LK-1130075

Kawdana East Grama Niladhari Division is a Grama Niladhari Division of the Dehiwala Divisional Secretariat of Colombo District of Western Province, Sri Lanka . It has Grama Niladhari Division Code 539/42B.

Lotus Grove are located within, nearby or associated with Kawdana East.

Kawdana East is a surrounded by the Karagampitiya, Udyanaya, Bellanvila, Attidiya North, Katukurunduwatta, Kawdana West and Nedimala Grama Niladhari Divisions.

== Demographics ==
=== Ethnicity ===
The Kawdana East Grama Niladhari Division has a Sinhalese majority (74.6%) and a significant Moor population (15.4%) . In comparison, the Dehiwala Divisional Secretariat (which contains the Kawdana East Grama Niladhari Division) has a Sinhalese majority (60.5%), a significant Moor population (20.8%) and a significant Sri Lankan Tamil population (14.5%)

Ethnicity in Kawdana East
1. Sinhalese (74.6%)
2. Moor (15.4%)
3. Sri Lankan Tamil (6.10%)
4. Other (2.10%)
5. Burgher (1.90%)

=== Religion ===
The Kawdana East Grama Niladhari Division has a Buddhist majority (66.1%) and a significant Muslim population (16.1%) . In comparison, the Dehiwala Divisional Secretariat (which contains the Kawdana East Grama Niladhari Division) has a Buddhist majority (54.3%), a significant Muslim population (22.6%) and a significant Hindu population (12.1%)

Religion in Kawdana East
1. Buddhist (66.1%)
2. Muslim (16.1%)
3. Roman Catholic (8.30%)
4. Hindu (5.00%)
5. Other Christian (4.40%)
6. Other (0.20%)
