= Nedimala Grama Niladhari Division =

Nedimala
- Grama Niladhari Division
- Interactive map of Nedimala
- Coordinates: 6.855543°N 79.881292°E
- Country: Sri Lanka
- Province: Western Province
- District: Colombo District
- Divisional Secretariat: Dehiwala Divisional Secretariat
- Electoral District: Colombo Electoral District
- Polling Division: Dehiwala Polling Division

Area
  - Total: 0.88 km^{2} (0.34 sq mi)
- Elevation: 28 m (92 ft)

Population (2012)
  - Total: 9,058
  - Density: 10,293/km^{2} (26,660/sq mi)
- ISO 3166 code: LK-1130055

Nedimala

Nedimala Grama Niladhari Division is a Grama Niladhari Division of the Dehiwala Divisional Secretariat of Colombo District of Western Province, Sri Lanka . It has Grama Niladhari Division Code 536.

National Zoological Gardens of Sri Lanka are located within, nearby or associated with Nedimala.

Nedimala is a surrounded by the Kalubovila, Udyanaya, Bellanvila, Kawdana East, Kohuwala and Pepiliyana West Grama Niladhari Divisions.

== Demographics ==
=== Ethnicity ===
The Nedimala Grama Niladhari Division has a Sinhalese majority (70.2%) and a significant Moor population (15.0%) . In comparison, the Dehiwala Divisional Secretariat (which contains the Nedimala Grama Niladhari Division) has a Sinhalese majority (60.5%), a significant Moor population (20.8%) and a significant Sri Lankan Tamil population (14.5%)

Ethnicity in Nedimala
1. Sinhalese (70.2%)
2. Moor (15.0%)
3. Sri Lankan Tamil (8.90%)
4. Burgher (2.70%)
5. Other (1.90%)
6. Malay (1.20%)

=== Religion ===
The Nedimala Grama Niladhari Division has a Buddhist majority (63.6%) and a significant Muslim population (17.2%) . In comparison, the Dehiwala Divisional Secretariat (which contains the Nedimala Grama Niladhari Division) has a Buddhist majority (54.3%), a significant Muslim population (22.6%) and a significant Hindu population (12.1%)

Religion in Nedimala
1. Buddhist (63.6%)
2. Muslim (17.2%)
3. Hindu (7.60%)
4. Roman Catholic (7.40%)
5. Other Christian (4.10%)
6. Other (0.10%)

== Gallery ==
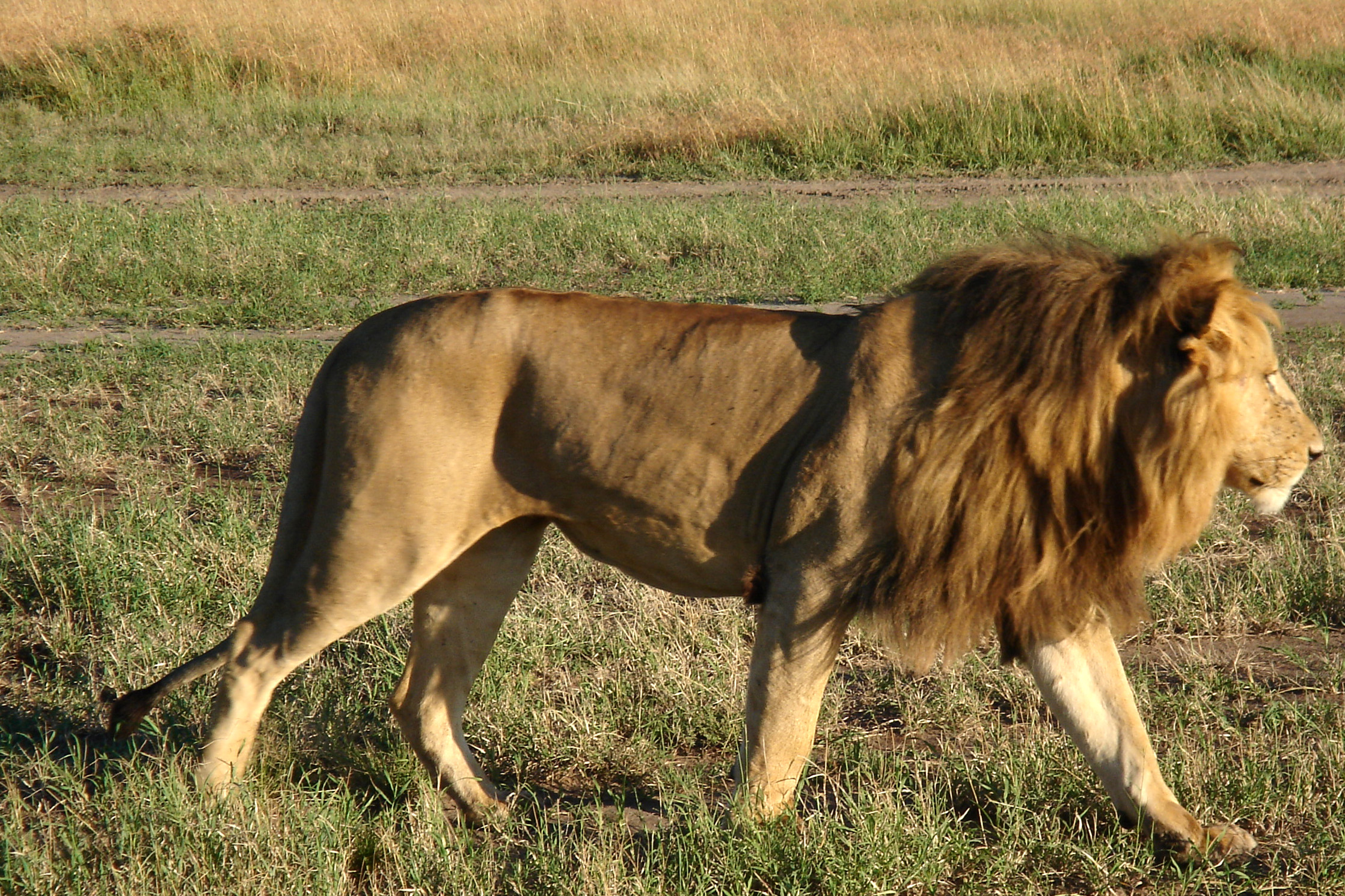
National Zoological Gardens of Sri Lanka
