= Sri Anjaneyar Kovil =

Sri Anjaneyar Kovil, Mount Lavinia
- ஸ்ரீ ஆஞ்சநேயர் கோவில்
- Location in Sri Lanka

Religion
- Affiliation: Hinduism
- District: Colombo
- Province: Western
- Deity: Hanuman

Location
- Location: Mount Lavinia
- Country: Sri Lanka
- Interactive map of Sri Anjaneyar Kovil, Mount Lavinia
- Coordinates: 06°52′02.3″N 79°51′58.2″E

Architecture
- Type: Dravidian architecture
- Completed: 1996

Sri Anjaneyar Kovil is a Hindu temple situated in Mount Lavinia, in Colombo, Sri Lanka. It is dedicated to God Hanuman, one of the central characters of the Hindu epic Ramayana. Established on 30 June 1996, the temple is considered to be the only Hindu shrine in the country where a statue of Hanuman with Panchamuga (five faced) is found. It is also said to be the only temple in the world to have a chariot for Anjaneyar.

== See also ==
- Hinduism in Sri Lanka
