= Channa-Upuli Performing Arts Foundation =

Sri Lankan performing arts organization

- Formation: 1998
- Founders: Channa Wijewardena & Upuli Panibharatha
- Headquarters: Dehiwala, Sri Lanka

Channa-Upuli Performing Arts Foundation is a Sri Lankan performing arts organization based in Dehiwala, Sri Lanka.

== Background ==
Channa Wijewardena and his wife Upuli Panibharatha founded the Channa-Upuli Performing Arts Foundation.

Channa and Upuli specializes in all forms of traditional and creative dancing in Sri Lanka – namely Kandyan and Sabaragamuwa; and also Channa in his own creative modern ballet.

== Dancing style ==
Channa's modern dance which he calls “Body Language” is also based on “Thribanga” which signifies the three curves of a woman's body and is a flexible style performed by his graceful dancers.

Channa's performances also include all types of traditional Sri Lankan drum patterns with the traditional Kandyan, low country and Sabaragamuwa drums.

Channa learned traditional Sri Lankan dance forms under Dr. Chitrasena in Sri Lanka at a young age, and then he later studied other forms of dance in India and classical ballet in France.

== International performances ==
The troupe has performed in many famous theatres, including Sadler's Wells Theatre and the Queen Elizabeth Hall in the UK, as well as the Sydney Opera House and the Regent Theatre in Australia.

In 1998 Channa and his troupe performed in the presence of Charles, Prince of Wales at the Presidential House when Sri Lanka celebrated its 50 years of Independence.

This dance troupe brought great pride to Sri Lanka when they won first place out of 178 countries participating in the Lions Parade at the International Lions Convention in Denver in 2003.

They also participated in the International Lions Convention in Hong Kong in 2004, Chicago in 2007 and Thailand in 2008.

== Awards ==
Channa and Upuli have won awards, both locally and internationally, for their dance achievements.

Japanese government bestowed to Channa the honorary award for “Performing Arts”.

In 2005 the President of Sri Lanka awarded Channa the highest honorary award “Kala Suri.”

== See also ==
- Dances of Sri Lanka
