= Pepiliyana West Grama Niladhari Division =

Pepiliyana West
- Grama Niladhari Division
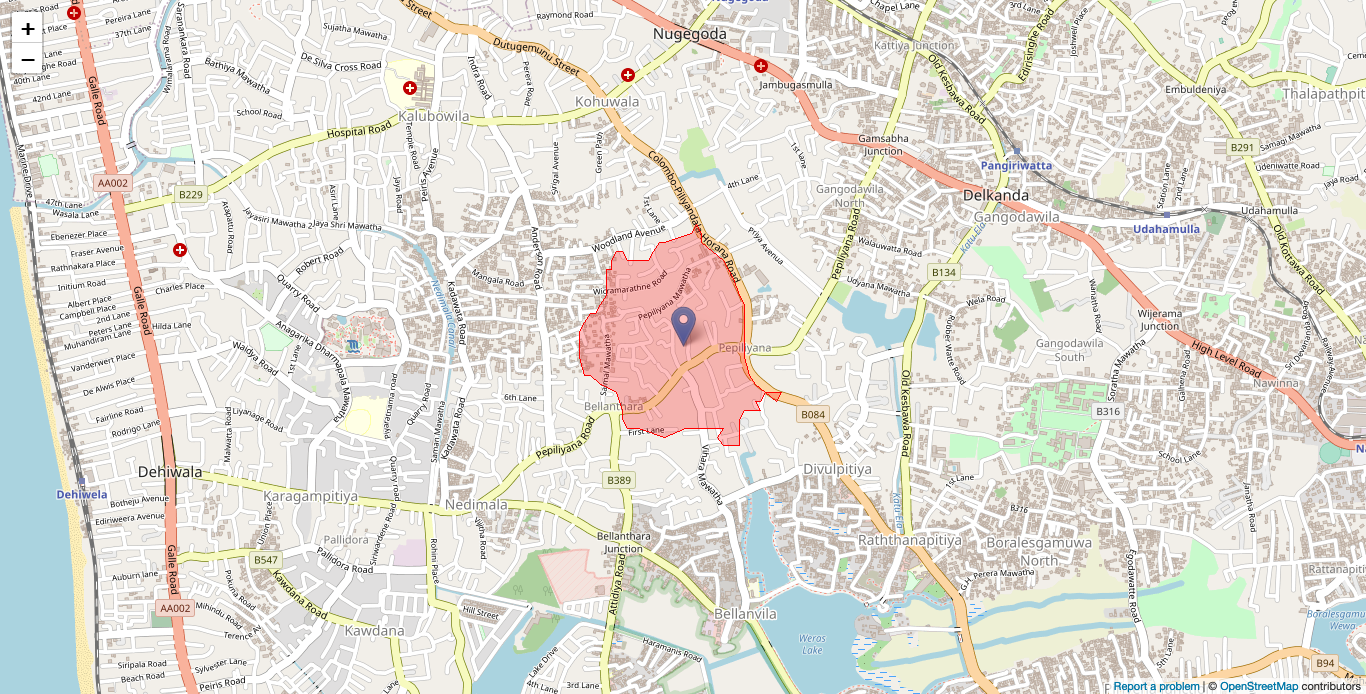
- Pepiliyana West Grama Niladhari Division
- Coordinates: 6.856611°N 79.887993°E
- Country: Sri Lanka
- Province: Western Province
- District: Colombo District
- Divisional Secretariat: Kesbewa Divisional Secretariat
- Electoral District: Colombo Electoral District
- Polling Division: Kesbewa Polling Division

Area
  - Total: 0.68 km^{2} (0.26 sq mi)
- Elevation: 26 m (85 ft)

Population (2012)
  - Total: 5,039
  - Density: 7,410/km^{2} (19,200/sq mi)
- ISO 3166 code: LK-1136005

Pepiliyana West Grama Niladhari Division is a Grama Niladhari Division of the Kesbewa Divisional Secretariat of Colombo District of Western Province, Sri Lanka. It has Grama Niladhari Division Code 535.

Pepiliyana West is a surrounded by the Bellanvila, Kohuwala, Nedimala, Divulpitiya West and Pepiliyana East Grama Niladhari Divisions.

== Demographics ==
=== Ethnicity ===
The Pepiliyana West Grama Niladhari Division has a Sinhalese majority (90.0%). In comparison, the Kesbewa Divisional Secretariat (which contains the Pepiliyana West Grama Niladhari Division) has a Sinhalese majority (97.3%)

Ethnicity in Pepiliyana West
1. Sinhalese (90.0%)
2. Sri Lankan Tamil (3.00%)
3. Moor (2.60%)
4. Burgher (1.80%)
5. Other (1.60%)
6. Malay (1.10%)

=== Religion ===
The Pepiliyana West Grama Niladhari Division has a Buddhist majority (81.2%). In comparison, the Kesbewa Divisional Secretariat (which contains the Pepiliyana West Grama Niladhari Division) has a Buddhist majority (93.0%)

Religion in Pepiliyana West
1. Buddhist (81.2%)
2. Roman Catholic (7.50%)
3. Muslim (4.80%)
4. Other Christian (3.40%)
5. Hindu (2.80%)
6. Other (0.20%)
