= Kohuwala =

Kohuwala කොහුවල கொக்குவளை
- Suburb
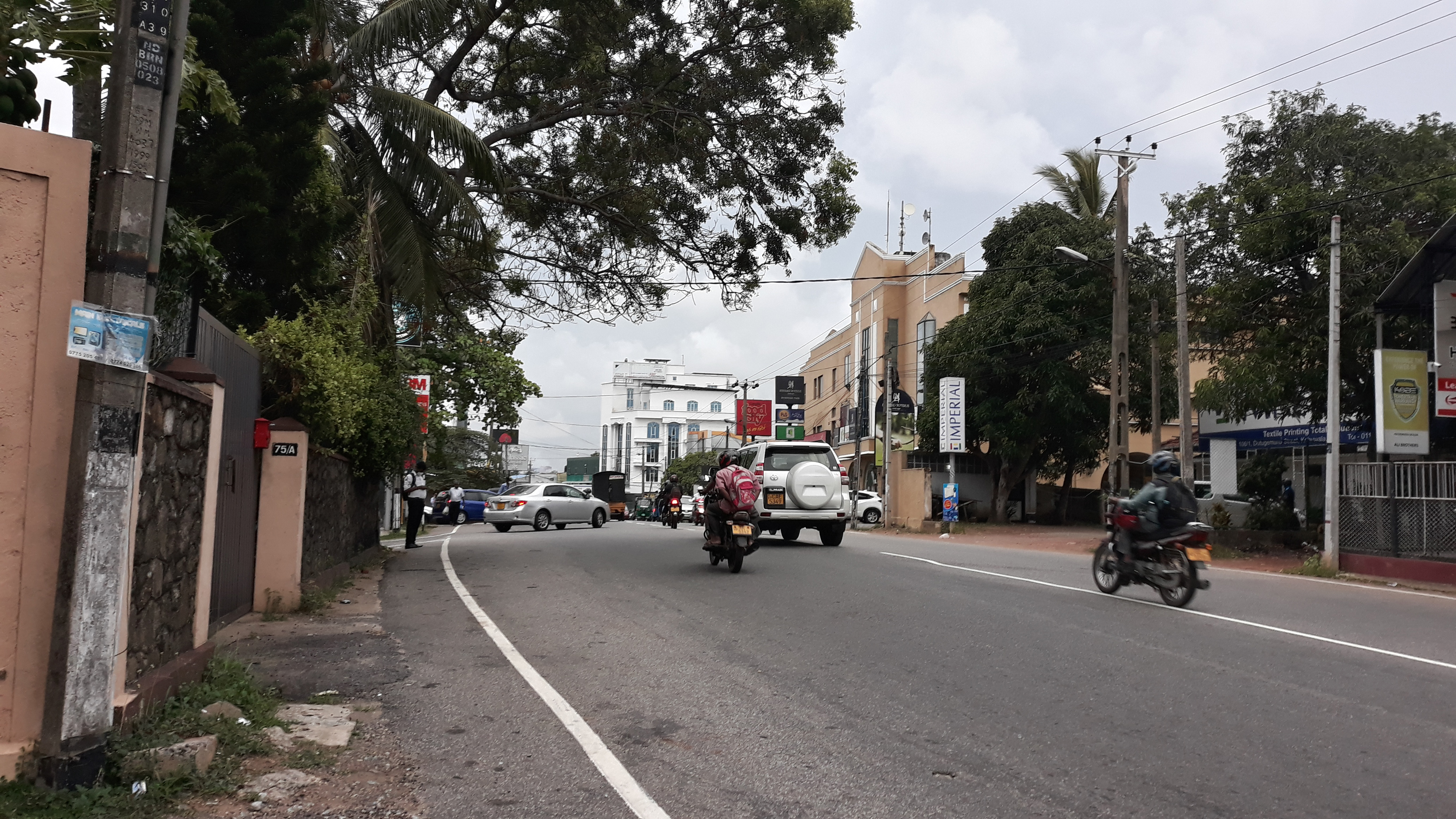
- S De S. Jayasinghe Mawatha, Kohuwala

- Location in Colombo District
- Coordinates: 6°52′31″N 79°52′31″E
- Country: Sri Lanka
- Province: Western Province
- District: Colombo District
- Time zone: UTC+5:30 (Sri Lanka Standard Time Zone)
- Postal Code: 10250

Kohuwala is a suburb in Colombo, Sri Lanka and is situated where the Colombo Piliyandala Road crosses Nugegoda Dehiwala Road. Hence it is connected to Nugegoda, Dehiwala, Pamankada, Boralesgamuwa and Piliyandala. Kohuwala is inside the administration boundary of Dehiwala-Mount Lavinia Municipal Council.

== Schools and universities ==
- University of Dancing and Performing Arts
- Lyceum International School
- Colombo South International College
