= Mount-Lavinia =

Mount Lavinia ගල්කිස්ස கல்கிசை
- Suburb
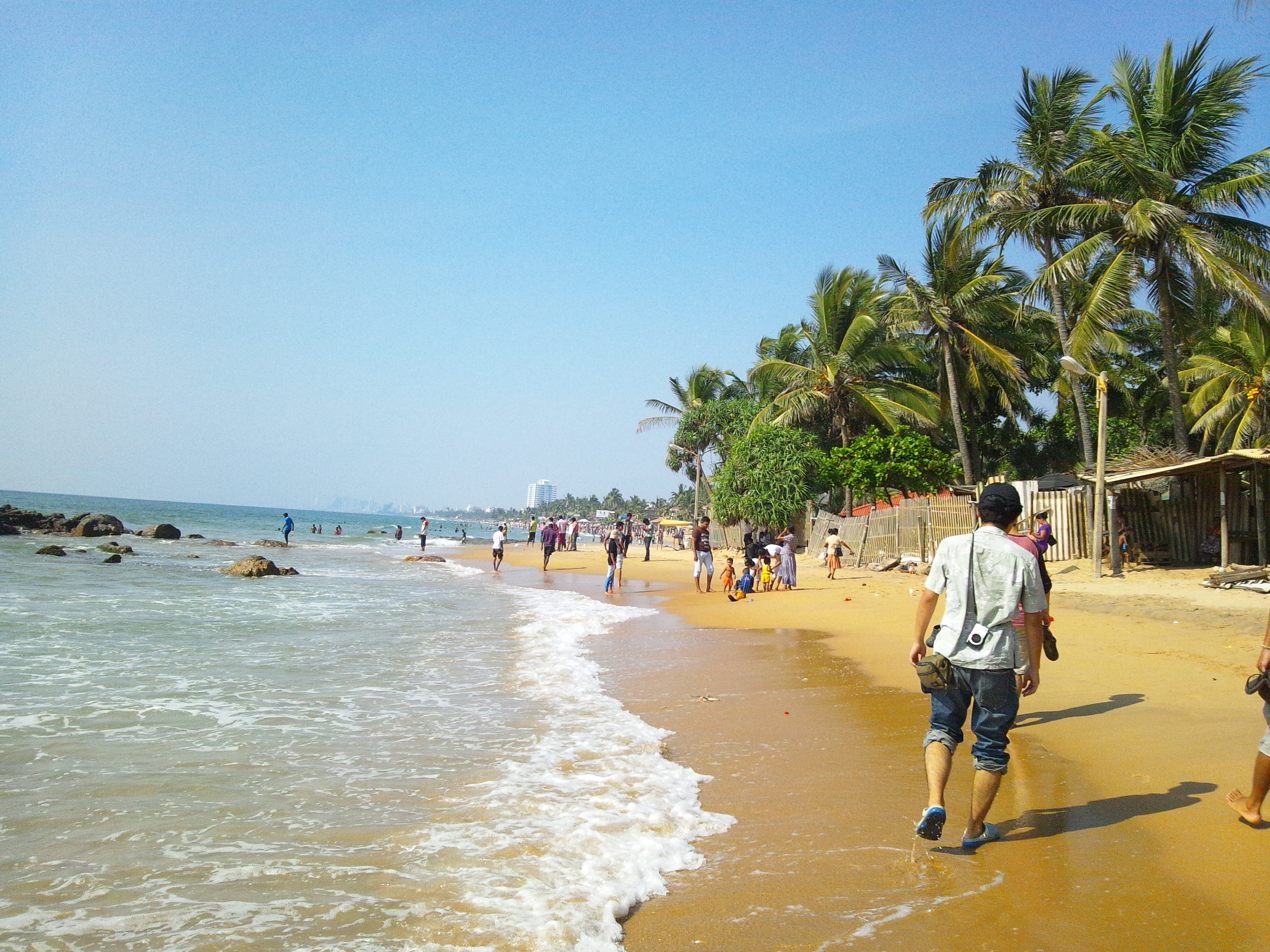

- Location within Colombo District
- Coordinates: 6°52′0″N 79°52′0″E
- Country: Sri Lanka
- Province: Western Province
- District: Colombo District
- Time zone: UTC+5:30 (Sri Lanka Standard Time Zone)

Mount Lavinia (Sinhala: ගල්කිස්ස, Tamil: கல்கிசை) is a suburb in Colombo, Sri Lanka located within the administrative boundaries of the Dehiwala-Mount Lavinia municipal limits.

The area is a mostly residential suburb, known as Colombo's beach retreat it is famed for its "Golden Mile" of beaches.

The town came into official recognition when Governor Sir Thomas Maitland used the postal address Mt. Lavinia, Ceylon, in 1805, while writing to the British Secretary of State, Lord Castlereagh.

The suburb also boasts S.Thomas' College, one of Sri Lanka's most prestigious primary and secondary schools and Girls' High school, one of Sri Lanka's most popular girls schools. It is one of the most liberal regions in Sri Lanka and has played host to the island's annual Gay Pride and Rainbow Kite Festival since 2005.

== Etymology ==
The area's name arose when the second Governor of Ceylon, Sir Thomas Maitland, acquired land at "Galkissa" (Mount Lavinia) and decided in 1806 to construct a personal residence there. Maitland fell in love with Lovina Aponsuwa, a local mestiço dancer, and continued a romantic affair with her until he was recalled to England in 1811. The Governor's mansion, which he named "Mount Lavinia House" is now the Mount Lavinia Hotel and the village that surrounded the building has subsequently developed into a bustling area, taking its name from the Governor's mistress, Lovina. In 2023, a song based on this story titled "Loveena" was released by Chitral Somapala and Kanchana Anuradhi. The song was written by Kamal Gunaratne, Secretary to the Ministry of Defence.

There are other explanations rooted in geography and the natural surroundings, when it comes to the origin of the name Mount Lavinia. The Sinhalese who lived on the coastal belt had named the promontory "Lihiniya Kanda" (Sinhala: ලිහිණියා කන්ද) or "Lihiniyagala" (Sinhala: ලිහිණියාගල) meaning the hill of the sea gull or the rock of the sea gull.

The local name for the town today is Galkissa - "kissa" (කිස්ස) being a somewhat obsolete Sinhala word for rock.
