= Dehiwala =

Suburban area in Sri Lanka

Dehiwala දෙහිවල தெஹிவளை
- Suburb
- Location within Sri Lanka
- Coordinates: 6°52′0″N 79°53′0″E
- Country: Sri Lanka
- Province: Western Province
- District: Colombo District
- Time zone: UTC+5:30 (Sri Lanka Standard Time Zone)

Dehiwala is a suburban area in Colombo, Sri Lanka. It lies within the administrative boundaries of Dehiwala-Mount Lavinia Municipal Council. It is known for the zoo which houses thousands of animals and hundreds of species.

== 2019 Easter Sunday attack ==
A reception hall of The Tropical Inn Hotel opposite to the National Zoological Gardens of Sri Lanka was also bombed during a series of explosions and two casualties were reported in the site.

== Arts and culture ==
- Channa-Upuli Performing Arts Foundation
