= Dehiwala Divisional Secretariat =

- Divisional Secretariat
- Country: Sri Lanka
- Province: Western Province
- District: Colombo District

Area
  - Total: 3.263 sq mi (8.450 km^{2})

Population (2024 census)
  - Total: 93,815
- Time zone: UTC+5:30 (Sri Lanka Standard Time)

Dehiwala Divisional Secretariat is a Divisional Secretariat of Colombo District, of Western Province, Sri Lanka.

== Demography ==
Religion in Dehiwala DS Division (2012)
1. Buddhist (54.3%)
2. Hindu (12.1%)
3. Muslim (22.6%)
4. Roman Catholic (6.70%)
5. Other Christian (4.10%)
6. Other (0.10%)
