= List of Polygala species =

As of July 2024, Plants of the World Online accepted about 420 species in the genus Polygala.

== A ==
- Polygala abyssinica R.Br. ex Fresen.
- Polygala acarnanica (Chodat) Kožuharov & A.V.Petrova
- Polygala acicularis Oliv.
- Polygala adamsonii Exell
- Polygala affinis DC.
- Polygala albida Schinz
- Polygala albowii Kem.-Nath.
- Polygala alpestris Rchb.
- Polygala alpicola Rupr.
- Polygala alpina (DC.) Steud.
- Polygala amara L.
- Polygala amarella Crantz
- Polygala amatymbica Eckl. & Zeyh.
- Polygala amboniensis Gürke
- Polygala amphothrix S.F.Blake
- Polygala anatolica Boiss. & Heldr.
- Polygala andringitrensis Paiva
- Polygala angolensis Chodat
- Polygala ankaratrensis H.Perrier
- Polygala annectens S.F.Blake
- Polygala antunesii Gürke
- Polygala apiculata Huter, Porta & Rigo
- Polygala appressipilis S.F.Blake
- Polygala arcuata Hayata
- Polygala arenaria Willd.
- Polygala arenicola Gürke
- Polygala argentea Thulin
- Polygala arillata Buch.-Ham. ex D.Don
- Polygala arvensis Willd.
- Polygala arvicola Bojer
- Polygala asbestina Burch.
- Polygala aschersoniana Chodat
- Polygala atacorensis Jacq.-Fél.
- Polygala azizsancarii Dönmez

== B ==
- Polygala baetica Willk.
- Polygala baikiei Chodat
- Polygala bakeriana Chodat
- Polygala barbata R.A.Kerrigan
- Polygala barbellata S.K.Chen
- Polygala bariensis Thulin
- Polygala barklyensis R.A.Kerrigan
- Polygala baumii Gürke
- Polygala bawanglingensis F.W.Xing & Z.X.Li
- Polygala bifoliata R.A.Kerrigan
- Polygala biformipilis S.F.Blake
- Polygala birmanica Chodat
- Polygala boissieri Coss.
- Polygala bolbothrix Dunn
- Polygala bomiensis S.K.Chen & J.Parn.
- Polygala bowkerae Harv.
- Polygala brachyanthema S.F.Blake
- Polygala brachyphylla Chodat
- Polygala brachysepala S.F.Blake
- Polygala brachytropis S.F.Blake
- Polygala bracteolata L.
- Polygala brandegeeana Chodat
- Polygala britteniana Chodat
- Polygala butyracea Heckel
- Polygala buxiformis Hassk.

== C ==
- Polygala calcarea F.W.Schultz
- Polygala callispora Chodat
- Polygala canaliculata R.A.Kerrigan
- Polygala cardiocarpa Kurz
- Polygala carnosa Mukerjee
- Polygala carnosicaulis W.H.Chen & Y.M.Shui
- Polygala carueliana (Burnat ex A.W.Benn.) Caruel
- Polygala caucasica Rupr.
- Polygala caudata Rehder & E.H.Wilson
- Polygala chiapensis S.F.Blake
- Polygala chinensis L.
- Polygala citrina Thulin
- Polygala claessensii Chodat
- Polygala clavistyla R.A.Kerrigan
- Polygala comosa Schkuhr
- Polygala compacta Rose
- Polygala compressa H.Perrier
- Polygala conosperma Bojer
- Polygala conzattii Rose
- Polygala coralliformis R.A.Kerrigan
- Polygala crassitesta R.A.Kerrigan
- Polygala cretacea Kotov
- Polygala crista-galli Chodat
- Polygala cristata P.Taylor
- Polygala crotalarioides Buch.-Ham. ex DC.
- Polygala cuspidulata S.F.Blake

== D ==
- Polygala dasanensis Thulin
- Polygala dasyphylla Levyns
- Polygala declinata (Harv.) Paiva
- Polygala dependens R.A.Kerrigan
- Polygala dewevrei Exell
- Polygala dhofarica Baker
- Polygala didyma C.Y.Wu
- Polygala difficilis R.A.Kerrigan
- Polygala dimorphotricha R.A.Kerrigan
- Polygala dispar Ghaz.
- Polygala doerfleri Hayek
- Polygala dunniana H.Lév.

== E ==
- Polygala edmundii Chodat
- Polygala effusa Paiva & Thulin
- Polygala ehlersii Gürke
- Polygala elegans Royle
- Polygala eminensis Baker
- Polygala engleri Chodat
- Polygala engleriana Buscal. & Muschl.
- Polygala ephedroides Burch.
- Polygala ericifolia DC.
- Polygala eriocephala F.Muell. ex Benth.
- Polygala erioptera DC.
- Polygala erlangeri Gürke ex Chodat
- Polygala erubescens E.Mey. ex Chodat
- Polygala evolvulacea Barneby
- Polygala exelliana Troupin
- Polygala exilis DC.
- Polygala exsquarrosa Adema

== F ==
- Polygala fadimeana Dönmez & Çeçen
- Polygala fallax Hemsl.
- Polygala flavescens DC.
- Polygala forojulensis A.Kern.
- Polygala fragilis Paiva
- Polygala francisci Exell
- Polygala fruticosa P.J.Bergius
- Polygala furcata Royle

== G ==
- Polygala gabrielae Domin
- Polygala galeocephala R.A.Kerrigan
- Polygala galeottii Chodat
- Polygala ganguelensis Exell & Mendonça
- Polygala garcini DC.
- Polygala gawenensis Thulin
- Polygala gazensis Baker f.
- Polygala geniculata R.A.Kerrigan
- Polygala gerrardii Chodat
- Polygala gilletiana E.Petit
- Polygala gillettii Paiva
- Polygala glaucifolia R.A.Kerrigan
- Polygala glaucoides L.
- Polygala globulifera Dunn
- Polygala goetzei Gürke
- Polygala gomesiana Welw. ex Oliv.
- Polygala gondarensis Chiov.
- Polygala gossweileri Exell & Mendonça
- Polygala goudahensis Paiva
- Polygala gracilenta Burtt Davy
- Polygala gracilipes Harv.
- Polygala grandidieri Baill.
- Polygala greveana Baill.
- Polygala grossheimii Kem.-Nath.
- Polygala guerichiana Engl.
- Polygala guilanica Sarvi & Faghir
- Polygala guineensis Willd.
- Polygala guneri Yıld.
- Polygala gymnoclada MacOwan
- Polygala gypsophila Thulin

== H ==
- Polygala hainanensis Chun & F.C.How
- Polygala hamarensis Thulin & Raimondo
- Polygala helenae Greuter
- Polygala heterantha H.Perrier
- Polygala hildebrandtii Baill.
- Polygala hirsutula Arn.
- Polygala hispida Burch. ex DC.
- Polygala hohenackeriana Fisch. & C.A.Mey.
- Polygala homblei Exell
- Polygala hongkongensis Hemsl.
- Polygala hottentotta C.Presl
- Polygala houtboshiana Chodat
- Polygala huillensis Welw. ex Oliv.
- Polygala humbertii H.Perrier
- Polygala humifusa Paiva

== I ==
- Polygala idukkiana M.Vishnu & Nampy
- Polygala illepida E.Mey. ex Harv.
- Polygala × ilseana Graebn.
- Polygala inaequiloba Turcz.
- Polygala inexpectata Peşmen & Erik
- Polygala integra R.A.Kerrigan
- Polygala irregularis Boiss.
- Polygala isaloensis H.Perrier
- Polygala isingii Pedley
- Polygala isocarpa Chodat

== J–K ==
- Polygala jacobii Chandrab.
- Polygala japonica Houtt.
- Polygala javana DC.
- Polygala kajii Paiva
- Polygala kalaboensis Paiva
- Polygala kalaxariensis Schinz
- Polygala karensium Kurz
- Polygala kasikensis Exell
- Polygala kilimandjarica Chodat
- Polygala kimberleyensis R.A.Kerrigan
- Polygala koi Merr.
- Polygala × kotovii Val.N.Tikhom.
- Polygala kradungensis H.Koyama
- Polygala krumanina Burch. ex Ficalho & Hiern
- Polygala kurdica C.C.Towns.
- Polygala kuriensis A.G.Mill.
- Polygala kyoukmyoungensis Mukerjee

== L ==
- Polygala labatii Wahlert, G.E.Schatz & Phillipson
- Polygala lactiflora Paiva & Brummitt
- Polygala langebergensis Levyns
- Polygala lasiosepala Levyns
- Polygala latistyla Pendry
- Polygala latouchei Franch.
- Polygala laxifolia Exell
- Polygala leendertziae Burtt Davy
- Polygala lehmanniana Eckl. & Zeyh.
- Polygala leptophylla Burch.
- Polygala leptosperma Chodat
- Polygala leucothyrsa Woronow
- Polygala levynsiana Paiva
- Polygala lhunzeensis C.Y.Wu & S.K.Chen
- Polygala lijiangensis C.Y.Wu & S.K.Chen
- Polygala limae Exell
- Polygala linariifolia Willdenow
- Polygala loanzensis Exell
- Polygala longeracemosa H.Perrier
- Polygala longifolia Poir.
- Polygala longipes S.F.Blake
- Polygala lozanii Rose
- Polygala ludwigiana Eckl. & Zeyh.
- Polygala luenensis Paiva
- Polygala lusitanica Welw. ex Chodat
- Polygala luteoviridis Chodat
- Polygala lysimachiifolia Chodat

== M ==
- Polygala macowaniana Paiva
- Polygala macrobotrya Domin
- Polygala macrolophos Hassk.
- Polygala macroptera DC.
- Polygala macrostigma Chodat
- Polygala magdalenae Brandegee
- Polygala major Jacq.
- Polygala makaschwilii Kem.-Nath.
- Polygala malesiana Adema
- Polygala mandrarensis Phillipson & G.E.Schatz
- Polygala marensis Burtt Davy
- Polygala mariamae Tamamsch.
- Polygala mascatensis Boiss.
- Polygala mazandaranica Sarvi & Faghir
- Polygala melilotoides Chodat
- Polygala mendoncae E.Petit
- Polygala meonantha Chodat
- Polygala meridionalis Levyns
- Polygala messambuziensis Paiva
- Polygala microlopha Burch. ex DC.
- Polygala microphylla L.
- Polygala microtricha S.F.Blake
- Polygala moggii Raffaelli, Mosti & Tardelli
- Polygala monspeliaca L.
- Polygala mooneyi M.G.Gilbert
- Polygala mossamedensis Paiva
- Polygala mossii Exell
- Polygala multicaulis Tausch
- Polygala multiflora Poir.
- Polygala multifurcata Mildbr.
- Polygala muratii Jacq.-Fél.
- Polygala myriantha Chodat
- Polygala myrtifolia L.
- Polygala myrtillopsis Welw. ex Oliv.

== N ==
- Polygala nambalensis Gürke
- Polygala nathadzeae A.I.Kuth.
- Polygala nematocaulis Levyns
- Polygala nematophylla Exell
- Polygala neurocarpa Brandegee
- Polygala nicaeensis Risso ex W.D.J.Koch
- Polygala nodiflora Chodat
- Polygala nyikensis Exell

== O ==
- Polygala oaxacana Chodat
- Polygala obliqua Pendry
- Polygala obtusissima Hochst. ex Chodat
- Polygala obversa R.A.Kerrigan
- Polygala ohlendorfiana Eckl. & Zeyh.
- Polygala oligosperma C.Y.Wu
- Polygala oliveriana Exell & Mendonça
- Polygala oophylla S.F.Blake
- Polygala ophiura Chodat
- Polygala orbicularis Benth.
- Polygala oreotrephes B.L.Burtt

== P–Q ==
- Polygala padulae Arrigoni
- Polygala pallida E.Mey. ex Harv.
- Polygala paludicola Gürke
- Polygala papilionacea Boiss.
- Polygala pappeana Eckl. & Zeyh.
- Polygala papuana (Steenis) Meijden
- Polygala parkeri Levyns
- Polygala parrasana Brandegee
- Polygala parviloba R.A.Kerrigan
- Polygala × pawlowskii Rothm.
- Polygala pedemontana E.P.Perrier & B.Verl.
- Polygala pedicellata S.F.Blake
- Polygala peduncularis Burch. ex DC.
- Polygala pellucida Lace
- Polygala pendulina R.A.Kerrigan
- Polygala peplis Baill.
- Polygala perdurans Pendry
- Polygala perrieri Paiva
- Polygala persicariifolia DC.
- Polygala peshmenii Eren, Parolly, Raus & Kürschner
- Polygala petitiana A.Rich.
- Polygala petrophila R.A.Kerrigan
- Polygala phoenicistes S.F.Blake
- Polygala picta Charit.
- Polygala platyptera Bornm. & Gauba
- Polygala poggei Gürke
- Polygala polifolia C.Presl
- Polygala polyedra Brandegee
- Polygala pottebergensis Levyns
- Polygala praecox R.A.Kerrigan
- Polygala praetermissa Thulin
- Polygala praticola Chodat
- Polygala preslii Spreng.
- Polygala producta N.E.Br.
- Polygala pruinosa Boiss.
- Polygala pseudoalpestris (Gren.) Dalla Torre & Sarnth.
- Polygala pseudogarcini Chodat
- Polygala pseudohospita (Tamamsch.) Tamamsch.
- Polygala pterocarpa R.A.Kerrigan
- Polygala pteropoda H.Perrier
- Polygala pubiflora Burch. ex DC.
- Polygala pungens Burch.
- Polygala pycnantha R.A.Kerrigan
- Polygala pyroloides Gagnep.

== R ==
- Polygala rarifolia DC.
- Polygala rausiana U.Raabe, Kit Tan, Iatroú, Vold & Parolly
- Polygala recognita Chodat
- Polygala refracta Burch. ex DC.
- Polygala rehmannii Chodat
- Polygala reinii Franch. & Sav.
- Polygala resendeana Paiva
- Polygala resinosa S.K.Chen
- Polygala retamoides (H.Perrier) Wahlert, Phillipson & G.E.Schatz
- Polygala retiefiana Paiva & Figueiredo
- Polygala retifolia S.F.Blake
- Polygala rhinanthoides Sol. ex Benth.
- Polygala rhinostigma Chodat
- Polygala rhynchocarpa R.A.Kerrigan
- Polygala rigens Burch.
- Polygala rivularis Gürke
- Polygala robsonii Exell
- Polygala robusta Gürke
- Polygala rodrigueana Paiva
- Polygala rosea Desf.
- Polygala rosmarinifolia Wight & Arn.
- Polygala rossica Kem.-Nath.
- Polygala rupestris Pourr.
- Polygala rupicola Hochst. & Steud. ex A.Rich.
- Polygala russelliana S.F.Blake
- Polygala ruwenzoriensis Chodat

== S ==
- Polygala saccopetala R.A.Kerrigan
- Polygala sadebeckiana Gürke
- Polygala sandiaochiaoensis S.S.Ying
- Polygala sardoa Chodat
- Polygala saxicola Dunn
- Polygala schinziana Chodat
- Polygala schirvanica Grossh.
- Polygala schoenlankii O.Hoffm. & Hildebr.
- Polygala schweinfurthii Chodat
- Polygala scorpioides R.A.Kerrigan
- Polygala sekhukhuniensis Retief, S.J.Siebert & A.E.van Wyk
- Polygala seminuda Harv.
- Polygala senensis Klotzsch
- Polygala septentrionalis Troupin
- Polygala serpentaria Eckl. & Zeyh.
- Polygala serpyllifolia Hosé
- Polygala sfikasiana Kit Tan
- Polygala sibirica L.
- Polygala sinaica Botsch.
- Polygala sinisica Arrigoni
- Polygala × skrivanekii Podp.
- Polygala somaliensis Baker
- Polygala sophiae Kem.-Nath.
- Polygala sosnowskyi Kem.-Nath.
- Polygala sparsiflora Oliv.
- Polygala sphenoptera Fresen.
- Polygala stenoclada Benth.
- Polygala stenopetala Klotzsch
- Polygala stenosepala (Benth.) R.A.Kerrigan
- Polygala steudneri Chodat
- Polygala stocksiana Boiss.
- Polygala suanica Tamamsch.
- Polygala subdioica H.Perrier
- Polygala subopposita S.K.Chen
- Polygala subuniflora Boiss. & Heldr.
- Polygala succulenta R.A.Kerrigan
- Polygala sumatrana Miq.
- Polygala supina Schreb.

== T ==
- Polygala taiwanensis S.S.Ying
- Polygala tamamschaniae V.I.Dorof.
- Polygala tatarinowii Regel
- Polygala tenuicaulis Hook.f.
- Polygala tenuifolia Willd.
- Polygala tepperi F.Muell.
- Polygala teretifolia L.f.
- Polygala thunbergii DC.
- Polygala tinctoria Vahl
- Polygala tisserantii Jacq.-Fél.
- Polygala tonkinensis Chodat
- Polygala torrei Exell
- Polygala transcaucasica Tamamsch.
- Polygala transvaalensis Chodat
- Polygala tricholopha Chodat
- Polygala triflora L.
- Polygala triquetra C.Presl
- Polygala turcica Dönmez & Uğurlu

== U–V ==
- Polygala umbellata L.
- Polygala umbonata Craib
- Polygala uncinata E.Mey. ex Meisn.
- Polygala urartu Tamamsch.
- Polygala usafuensis Gürke
- Polygala validiflora R.A.Kerrigan
- Polygala velata S.F.Blake
- Polygala venenosa Juss. ex Poir.
- Polygala venulosa Sm.
- Polygala virgata Thunb.
- Polygala vittata Paiva
- Polygala vulgaris L.

== W–Z ==
- Polygala wattersii Hance
- Polygala welwitschii Chodat
- Polygala wenxianensis Y.S.Zhou & Z.X.Peng
- Polygala westii Exell
- Polygala wightiana Wall. ex Wight & Arn.
- Polygala wilmsii Chodat
- Polygala wittebergensis Compton
- Polygala wittei Exell
- Polygala woodii Chodat
- Polygala wuzhishanensis S.K.Chen & J.Parn.
- Polygala xanthina Chodat
- Polygala xanti A.Gray
- Polygala yemenica Chodat
- Polygala youngii Exell
- Polygala zambesiaca Paiva
