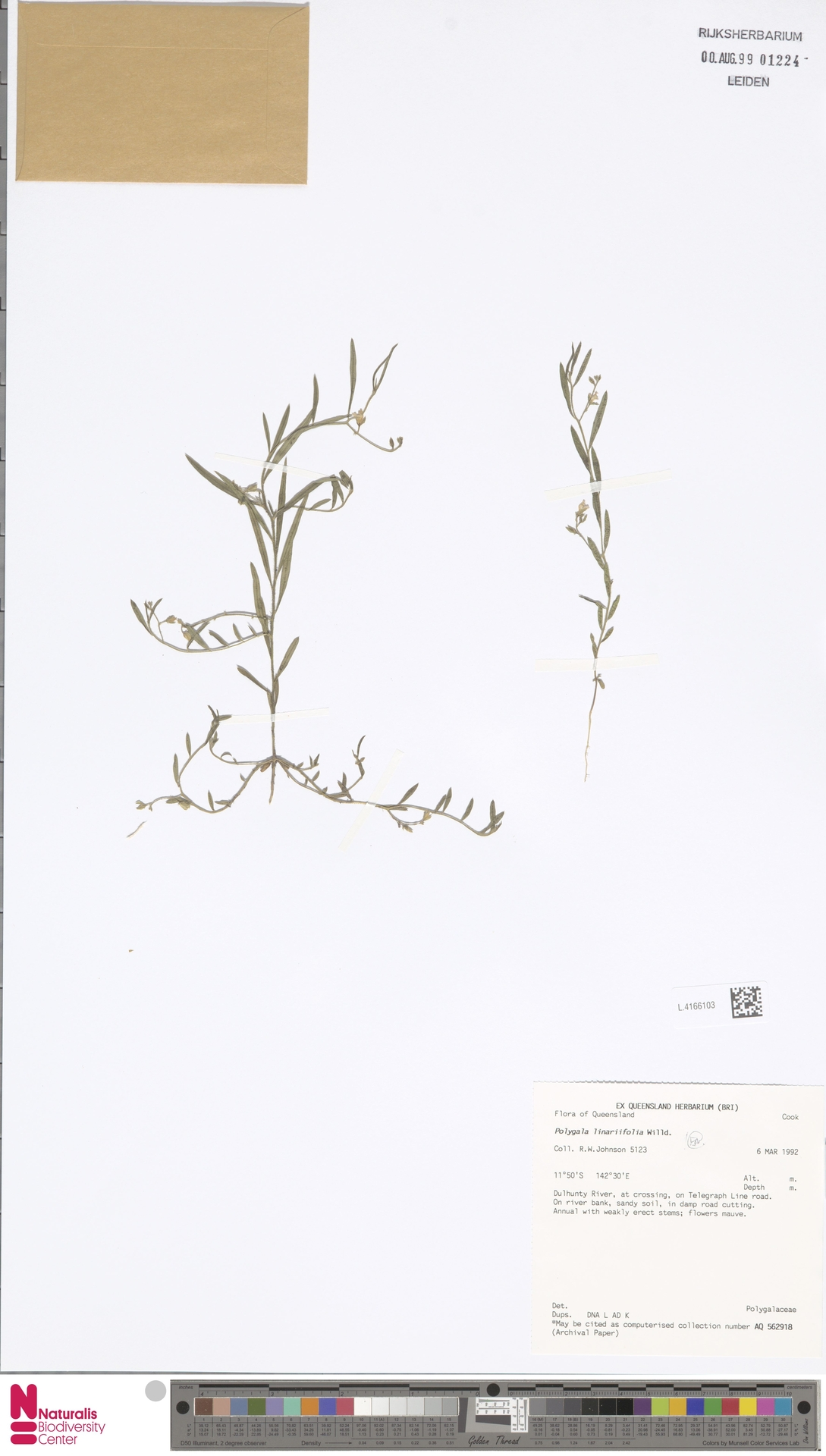
- Herbarium pressing of Polygala linariifolia Willd (1992)

Scientific classification
- Kingdom: Plantae
- Clade: Tracheophytes
- Clade: Angiosperms
- Clade: Eudicots
- Clade: Rosids
- Order: Fabales
- Family: Polygalaceae
- Genus: Polygala
- Species: P. linariifolia

Binomial name
- Polygala linariifolia Willd.
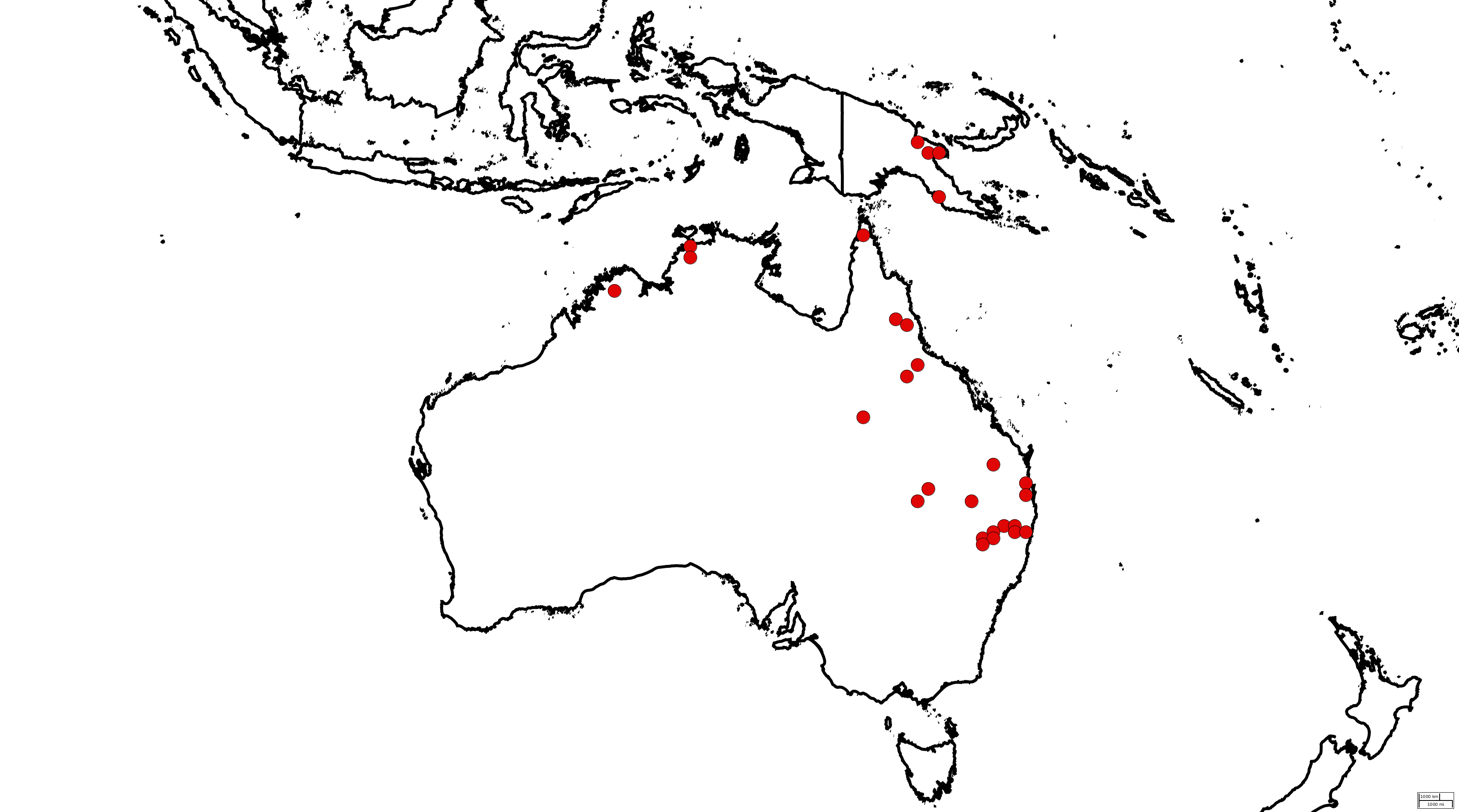
- Polygala linariifolia recordings in Australia and New Guinea from Australasian Virtual Herbarium June 17, 2023
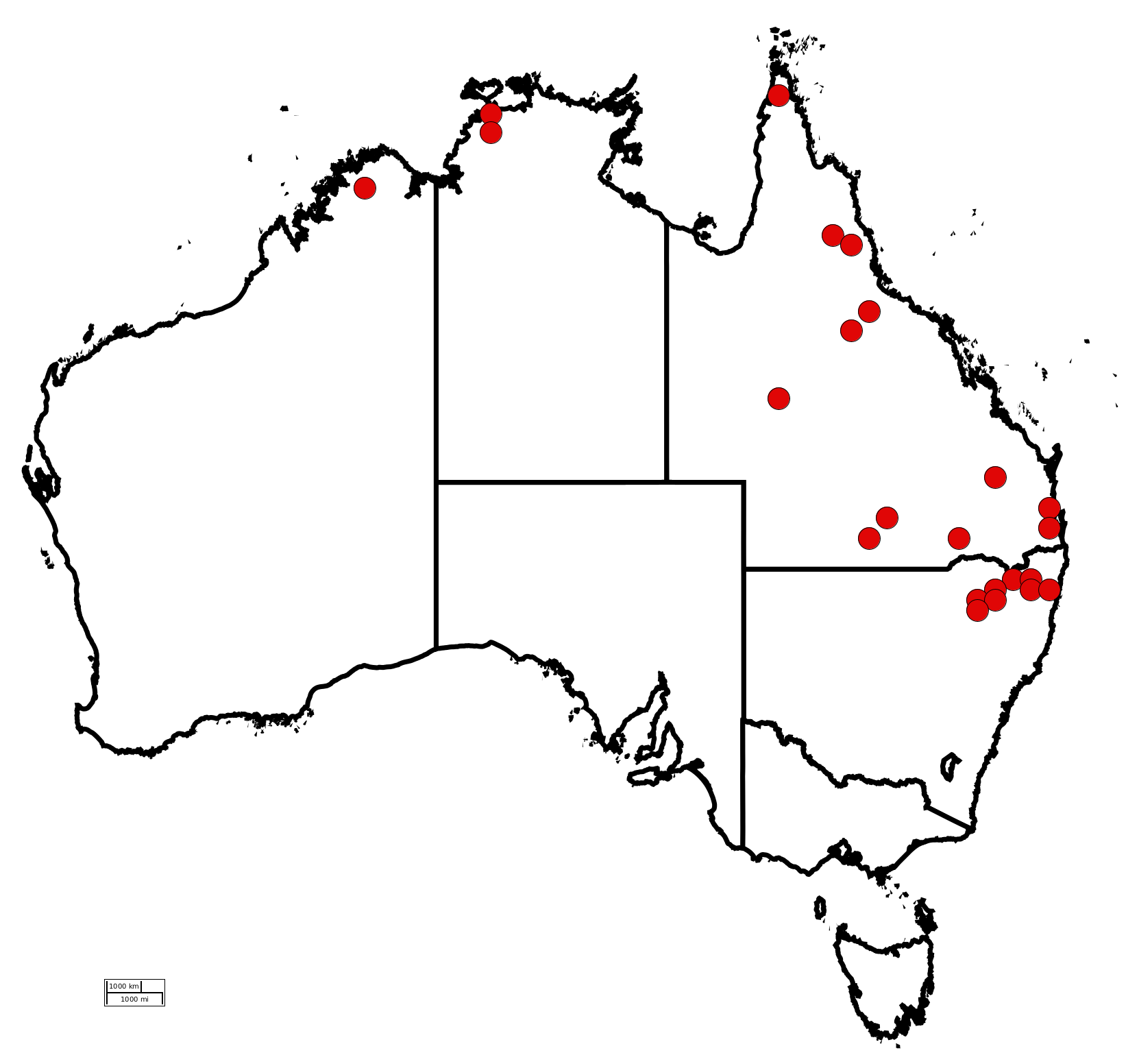
- Polygala linariifolia recordings in Australia from Australasian Virtual Herbarium June 17, 2023

= Polygala linariifolia =

Species of flowering plant

Polygala linariifolia is a species of flowering plant in the milkwort family (Polygalaceae). It extends worldwide, including in the Australian states of New South Wales, Queensland, Northern Territory and Western Australia, however due to obscure taxonomic classifications and similarities and cross-overs between other Polygala species, it is difficult to confirm the exact identity of P. linariifolia and its distribution across the world including Australia.

== Description ==
Polygala linariifolia, commonly known as "Native Milkwort", is a herb that can be either annual or perennial, reaching an approximate height of 20 cm. Stems possess curled or straight hairs, tap roots are woody in nature, whilst branches are generally up right.

Leaves typically grow up to 3.5 cm in length and are usually obovate in shape, getting broader towards the tip, however are known to vary in shape (linear-oblong or narrow-elliptic). Leaves are typically 5–45 mm in length, 1–10 mm wide, with a short point at the tip and dull in texture, due to the sparse covering in short hairs.

Flowers are arranged in a lateral raceme extending 1–9 cm, on a pedicel 2–6 mm with individual flowers 3–5 mm in length. Flowers vary in colour between a bluish purple and yellow, however on occasion may be white. Flowering typically occurs between September–February depending on the season. The fruit capsule is flattened in a broad-oblong shape approximately 3–4 mm long with a narrow wing. Encompassed within the capsule are black seeds with white hairs.

== Distribution ==
P. linariifolia is known to exist worldwide in countries such as China, Philippines, Thailand, India, New Guinea and Cambodia, in addition to Australia, which it is known to occur across four Australian states/territories, those including New South Wales (NSW), Queensland (QLD), Northern Territory (NT) and Western Australia (WA). Within NSW, P. linariifolia is generally found within dry sclerophyll communities in the NE of the state in areas surrounding Copeton Dam and Warialda, even stretching up into the NSW north coast in areas such as Casino and Kyogle. Populations are also known to occur in far west NSW, west of Hungerford. These occurrences align with the following NSW botanical subregions: North Coast; North Western Slopes; North Western Plains; and North Far Western Plains.

In QLD, P. linariifolia occurs most commonly in the Brigalow Belt, however is known to occur within South East Queensland and extend north to the Cairns area and west in Mulga Lands. In WA, a number of populations have been observed in the Northern Kimberley, in the Mitchell Plateau area, whilst in the NT, individuals have been recorded in the north of the territory, in areas including Adelaide River and Koolpinyah. However, due to nomenclature issues, it is likely that there are more populations present or that have been recorded under a different taxon name.

== Taxonomy ==
P. linariifolia was first named and published by German botanist and plant taxonomist, Carl Ludwig Willdenow in 1807 in the publication 'Species Plantarum. Editio quarta 3'. P. linariifolia is placed within the Fabales order. Successionally, it is located within the Polygalaceae family, where the Polygalaceae has a presence of five genera and 86 species within Australia. Some members of the Polygalaceae family (families such as some Comesperma and Polygala) are known to emit distinctive odours from the roots. The genera at focus, Polygala, is thought to of derived its name from the ancient Greek, with a meaning of "much milk" due to its perceived ability to increase milk yields in cattle.

Previously, P. linariifolia has been misapplied to a number of more recent Polygala species including: P. bifoliata, P. dimorphotricha, P. galeocephala and P. saccopetal. In addition to being misapplied, a number of variations of the species exist in the form of spelling differences and synonyms. P. linariifolia may also be spelled P. linarifolia and can be referred to as P. chinensis var linarifolia and or P. triflora depending on the process of taxonomic classification by varying taxonomists. There is strong argument that P. linariifolia has been synonymised under either Polygala triflora or Polygala glaucoides by F. Adema in 1966, and that P. linariifolia does not exist in Australia due to taxonomic reclassification. As a result, it makes it difficult to determine the true, worldwide abundance of P. linariifolia including across Australia, especially when P. linariifolia is currently referred to in NSW biodiversity and conservation legislation.

== Habitat and ecology ==
P. linariifolia commonly establish in sandy soils, typically in dry eucalypt forests with sparse understoreys, however are also known to grow in dark sandy loams on granite and within yellow podsolic soil on granite which are associated with layered open forests and shrubby forests of dominant Callitris and Eucalyptus species. In addition to these environments, the species has also been suggested to exist in 'waste places', grasslands and roadsides up to 1275m above sea level in the Malesia region.

Within the Australian continent, a number of tree species have been identified to associate with P. linariifolia such as Eucalyptus sphaerocarpa, Angophora floribunda, Allocasuarina torulosa, Eucalyptus trachyphloia, Angophora leiocarpa, Lophostemon suaveolens, Corymbia henryi in addition to the native herb, Wahlenbergia.

In some cases within Australia, the abundance and occurrence of P. linariifolia is thought to be heavily influenced by rainfall and water availability, where populations have been known to increase with above average summer rainfalls and suffer population decline in below average conditions. It is also suggested that individuals can be quite short lived and offer no value to grazing animals

Populations within New Guinea and the Philippines have been identified to show an erect habit, however when the main stem is subject to disturbance or destruction, a more prostrate habit is formed with the growth of lower, ground covering branches. The degree at which these individuals change between an erect habit and prostrate habit will alter depending on a range of factors eg. the severity of disturbance and destruction.

== Conservation status ==
Within Australia, populations of P. linariifolia are known to vary in conservation status, commonly being placed in the categories of rare, sparse, occasional and common. In south west QLD, populations have been recorded to be at times, fairly common, whilst in NSW, the species is currently listed as 'Endangered' under the Biodiversity Conservation Act 2016. Species listed as endangered are at very high risk of becoming extinct in Australia in the near future, however in the Australian Commonwealth legislation, the Environment Protection and Biodiversity Conservation Act 1999, P. linariifolia is not listed under any category. This is also the case for WA's, NT's and QLD's state/territory related threatened flora legislation.

Key threats that may impact population abundance and distribution of P. linariifolia include, clearing of habitat, grazing from stock and feral animals, competition and shading from invasive flora, disturbance from infrastructure maintenance and construction, changes in fire frequency and severity, forestry activities that disturb soil structure and damage ground cover and uncertainty in taxonomic classifications amongst species, making management difficult.
