= Väsby hage Nature Reserve =

Nature reserve in Stockholm, Sweden

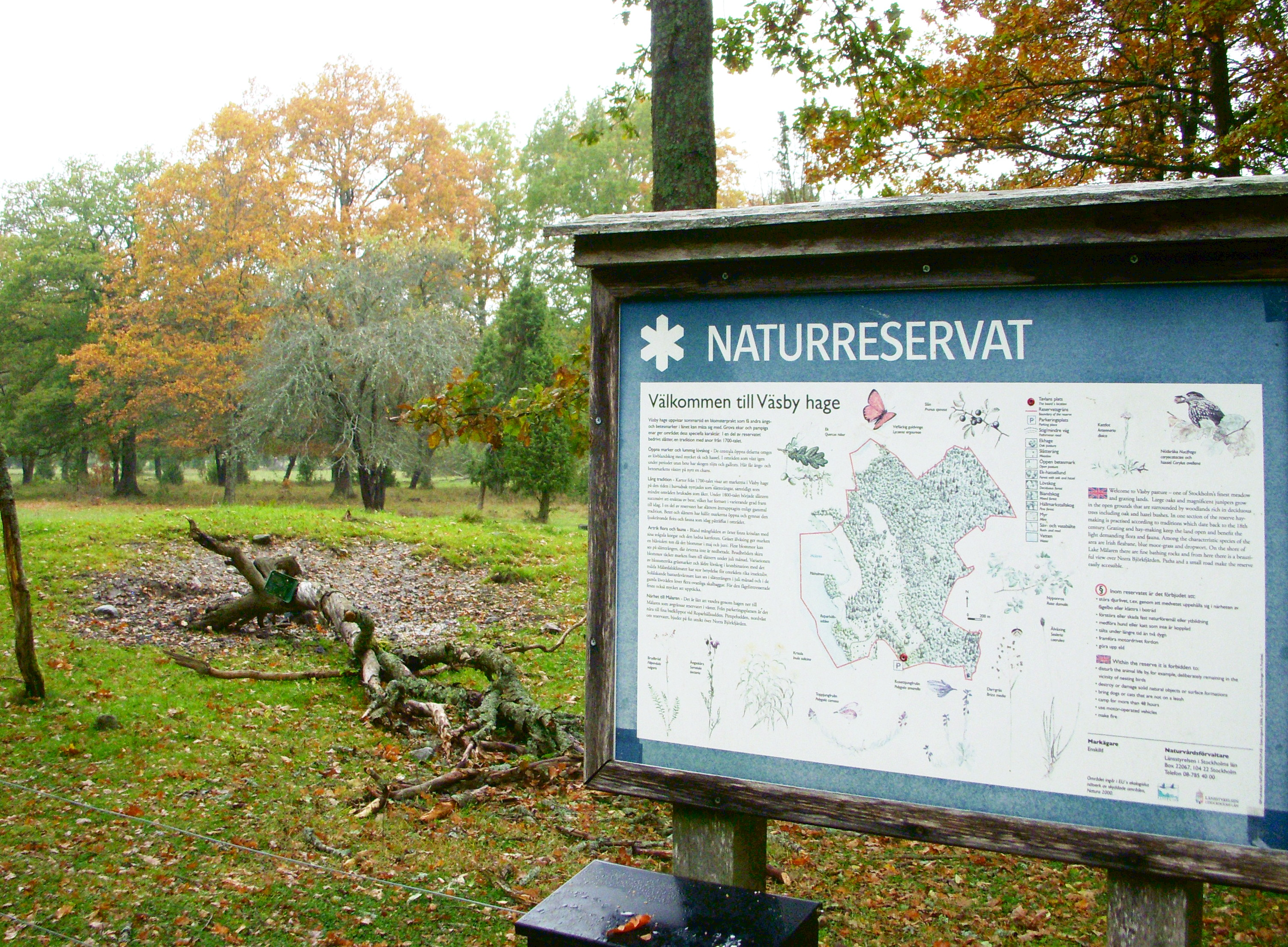

- Location within Stockholm
- Location: Sweden
- Nearest city: Ekerö
- Coordinates: 59°24′29″N 17°32′34″E
- Area: 119 ha (290 acres)
- Established: 1981

Väsby hage Nature Reserve (Swedish: Väsby hage naturreservat) is a nature reserve in Stockholm County in Sweden.

The nature reserve lies on Munsö, not far from Munsö Church, and consists of an area of old cultural landscape with meadows, patches of forest and groves. Large contiguous pastures dominated by stands of solitary oaks characterise much of the reserve. It has a rich flora and is also an important habitat for both insects and birds. Birds found here include spotted nutcracker and hawfinch; plants include Polygala comosa, blue moor grass and adder's tongue. It is part of the Natura 2000-network.
