= Munsö Church =

- Munsö kyrka
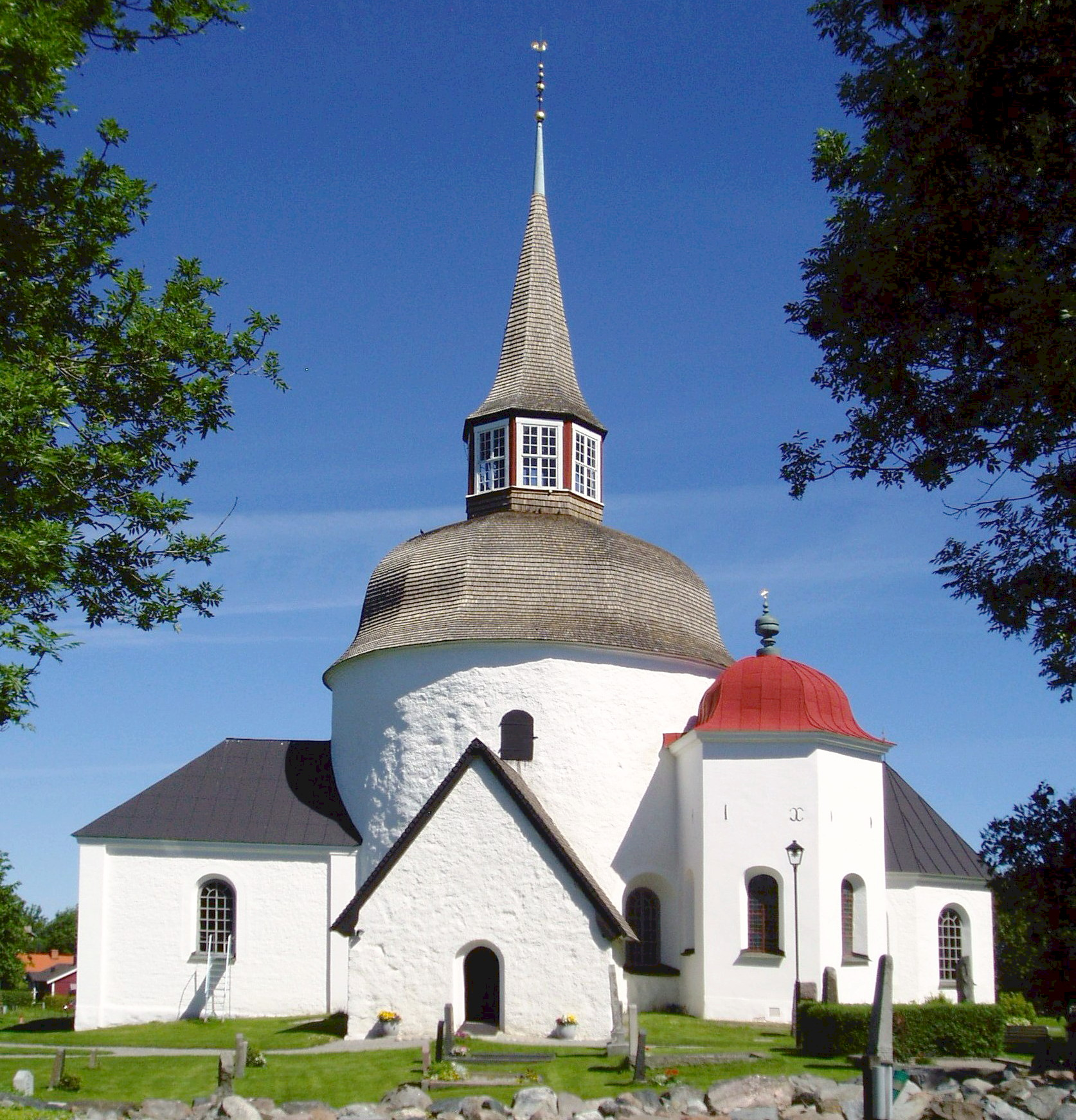
- Munsö Church, view of the exterior

- Location within Stockholm Location within Sweden
- 59°24′05″N 17°33′37″E
- Country: Sweden
- Denomination: Church of Sweden

Administration
- Diocese: Stockholm

Munsö Church (Swedish: Munsö kyrka) is a medieval Lutheran church in the Diocese of Stockholm. Its site, Munsö, is a village and formerly an island in Ekerö Municipality, Sweden. Because of post-glacial rebound, this island in Lake Mälaren is now connected to the island Ekerö. Munsö Church lies not far from Väsby hage Nature Reserve. The round church at Munsö is one of a few so-called round churches in Sweden.

== History ==
Traces of permanent habitations dating from the Bronze or Iron Age have been found in the area, and several of the larger farmsteads in the area are traceable back to the Iron Age. Munsö Church was possibly built for one such farm, called Bona.

The church dates from the 12th century. The exact date is unknown, but given the peculiarity that the church is fortified, its history has been connected with raids by Estonian pirates in the area in 1187. At the time, Bona farmstead was owned by the Archbishop of Uppsala, who may have commissioned the church. From the beginning, it was built to be able to serve both as a place of worship and as a defensive building. Above the church itself there was a large room which could house refugees in times of danger, and above this another floor designed for defence, with arrow slits in the wall. These floors have since disappeared.

During the 14th century, the sacristy was added, and the church porch in the 15th century. The main circular room of the church received its presently visible, star-shaped vault in the 1470s. A burial chapel for the owners of Bona farm was added in 1651–58. Further additions were made to the western end of the church in 1704–08. At the same time the church roof was changed into the Baroque cupola and spire visible today. During a renovation in 1856, the church windows were enlarged.

== Architecture ==
The medieval parts of the church are built by fieldstone and later additions are made by brick, today whitewashed. The church has a shake roof. Parts of both the entrance door and the door leading from the church porch into the church itself are medieval. The lower parts of the original, Romanesque entrance portal has been preserved in the wall between the church porch and the church.

Internally, the round church room is covered by a star-shaped vault, except for the choir and the later, 18th-century western addition. The 17th-century burial chapel is likewise covered by a polygonal vault; from the chapel the medieval stair leads up into the church cupola.

Among the church furnishings, the baptismal font is the oldest (c. 1200). The church also houses four carved wooden sculptures, dating from the 1470s and probably made in the Netherlands. The pulpit is Baroque, dating from 1651–53, while many of the other furnishings are later. The stained glass window behind the altar dates from 1905. Among the more unusual items in the church is a decorated chasuble from the 16th century.
