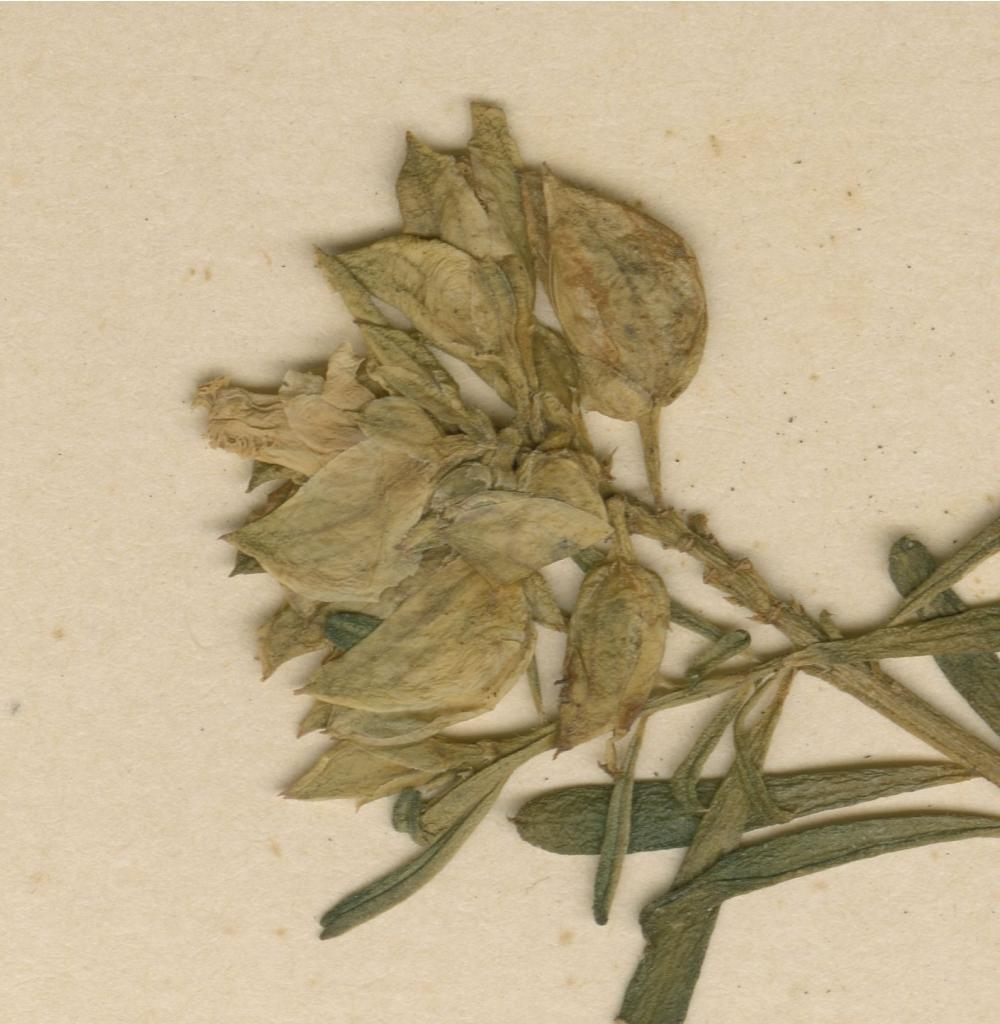
- Isotype at Herbarium of the University of Coimbra, Portugal

Scientific classification
- Kingdom: Plantae
- Clade: Embryophytes
- Clade: Tracheophytes
- Clade: Spermatophytes
- Clade: Angiosperms
- Clade: Eudicots
- Clade: Rosids
- Order: Fabales
- Family: Polygalaceae
- Genus: Polygala
- Species: P. baumii

Binomial name
- Polygala baumii Gürke

= Polygala baumii =

Species of flowering plant

Polygala baumii is a species of flowering plant. A perennial shrublet, it grows up to about 40 cm (16 in) in height. It is named for German botanist and horticulturalist Hugo Baum who was part of expeditions along the Cunene River and Zambezi River where he collected plants. It has been documented in Angola and Zambia. It is in the Polygalaceae family.

== See also ==
- List of Polygala species
