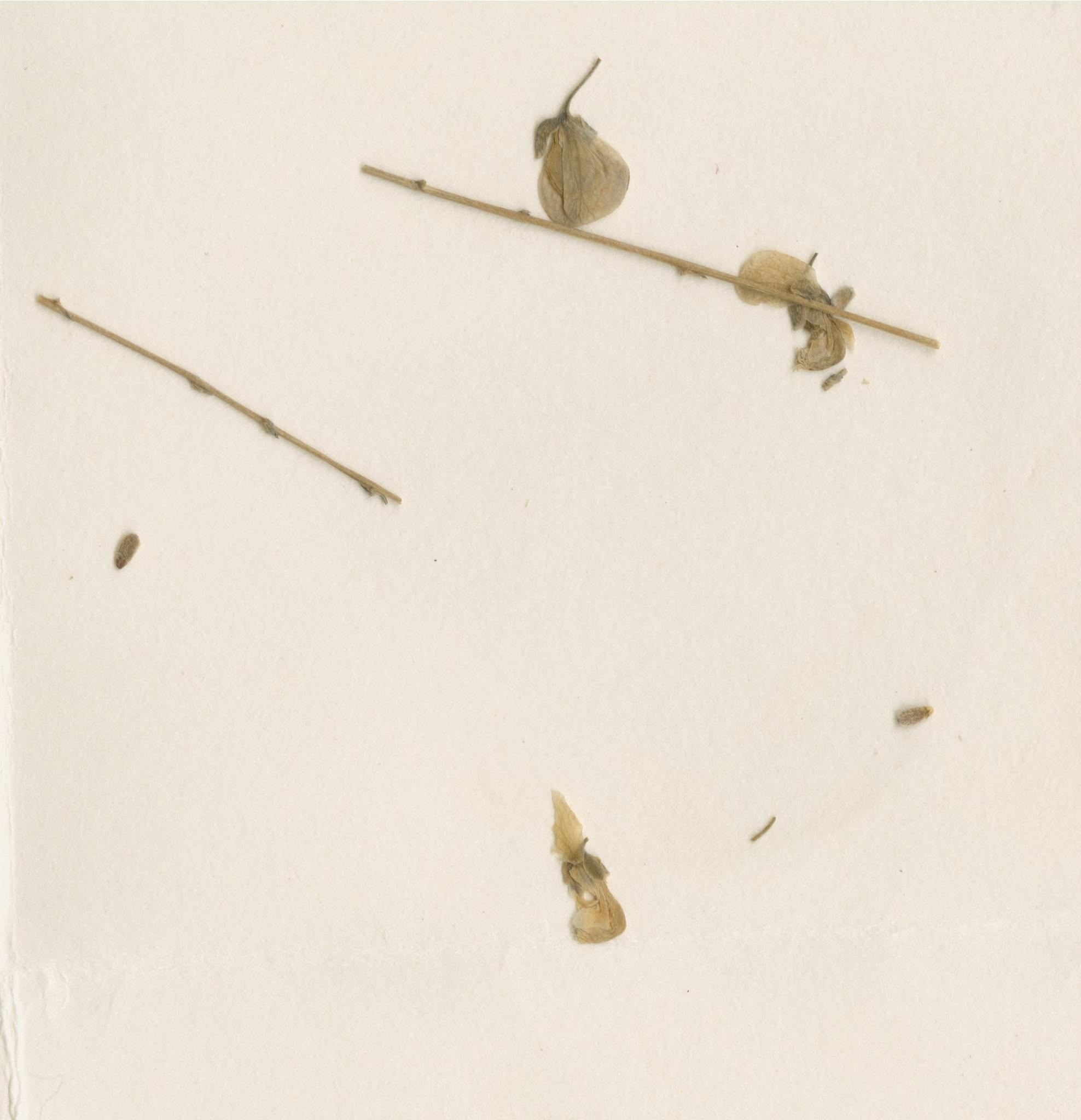

Scientific classification
- Kingdom: Plantae
- Clade: Embryophytes
- Clade: Tracheophytes
- Clade: Spermatophytes
- Clade: Angiosperms
- Clade: Eudicots
- Clade: Rosids
- Order: Fabales
- Family: Polygalaceae
- Genus: Polygala
- Species: P. angolensis

Binomial name
- Polygala angolensis Chodat

Synonyms
- Polygala ficalhoana Exell & Mendonça

= Polygala angolensis =

Species of flowering plant

Polygala angolensis is a species of milkwort that grows in seasonally dry areas of Angola.

It is noted as inhabiting moist grassland at an altitude of 1,850 m (6,070 ft).

== See also ==
- List of Polygala species
