= Polygala wattersii =

Conservation status
- Least Concern (IUCN 3.1)

Scientific classification
- Kingdom: Plantae
- Clade: Embryophytes
- Clade: Tracheophytes
- Clade: Spermatophytes
- Clade: Angiosperms
- Clade: Eudicots
- Clade: Rosids
- Order: Fabales
- Family: Polygalaceae
- Genus: Polygala
- Species: P. wattersii

Binomial name
- Polygala wattersii Hance

Synonyms
- Heterosamara wattersii (Hance) Paiva & P.Silveira; Polygala mariesii Hemsl.

Species of flowering plant

Polygala wattersii is a species of flowering plant. It is in the milkwort family Polygalaceae. It is native to China and is used in traditional medicine. The chemical constituents of its roots have been investigated. An evergreen, it is shrubby.

The species is named for Thomas Watters, a consular official, sinologist and botanical collector from Beitain who collected plants in Formosa, now Taiwan.

== See also ==
- List of Polygala species
