= Polygala myriantha =

Scientific classification
- Kingdom: Plantae
- Clade: Embryophytes
- Clade: Tracheophytes
- Clade: Spermatophytes
- Clade: Angiosperms
- Clade: Eudicots
- Clade: Rosids
- Order: Fabales
- Family: Polygalaceae
- Genus: Polygala
- Species: P. myriantha

Binomial name
- Polygala myriantha Chodat

Synonyms
- Polygala kisantuensis Chodat; Polygala kisantuensis var. tenuifolia Chodat

Species of flowering plant

Polygala myriantha is a species of flowering plant. An annual herb, it grows in East Africa, as well as central parts of the continent and as far west as Nigeria and Cameroon. It is in the milkwort (Polygacae) family. It grows to about 1 ft (0.30 m) high and has pink flowers.

Myrios (Greek: μύριος) means countless, innumerable, or myriad and anthos (ἄνθος) means flower or blossom.

== See also ==
- List of Polygala species
