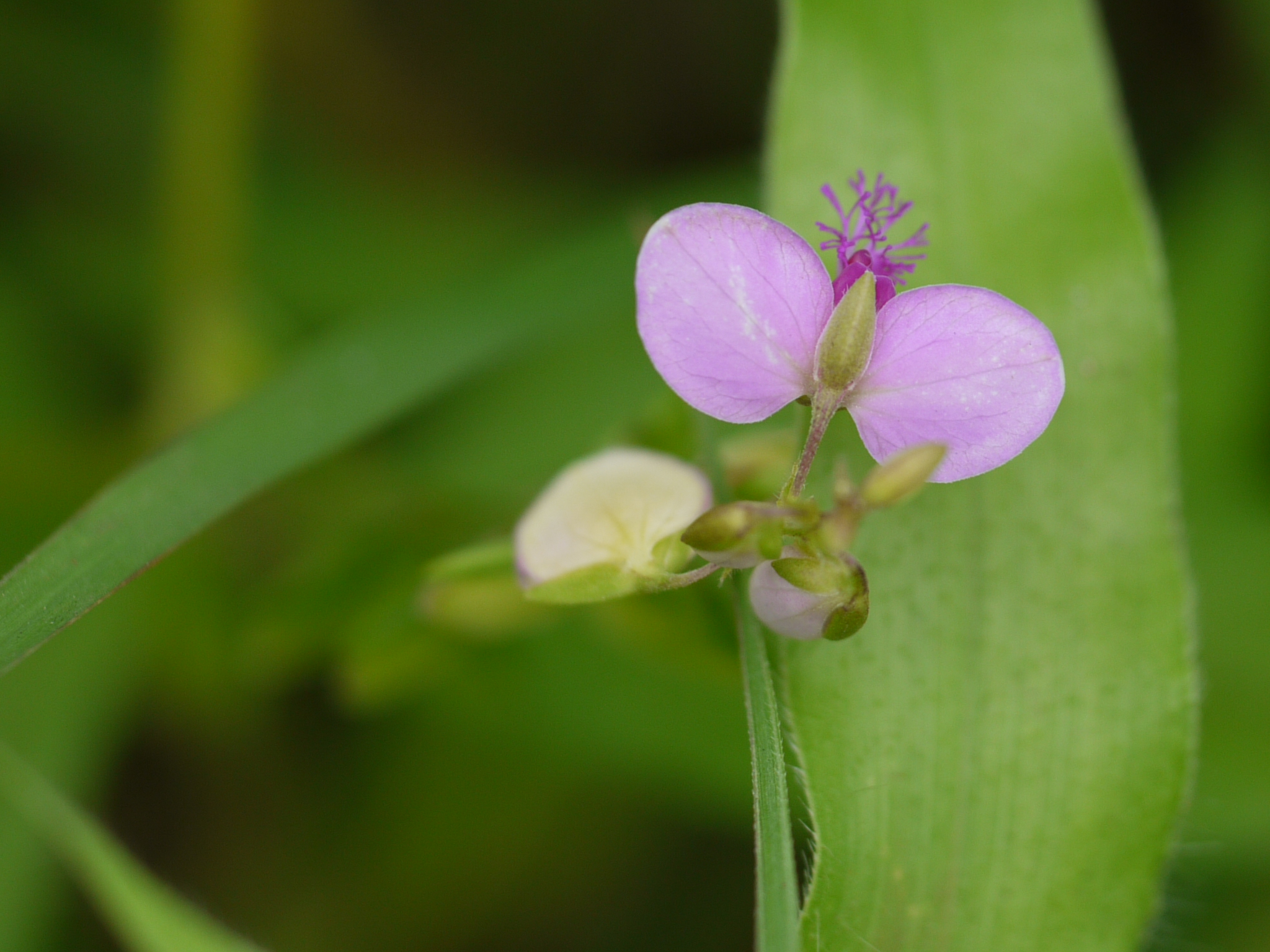

Scientific classification
- Kingdom: Plantae
- Clade: Tracheophytes
- Clade: Angiosperms
- Clade: Eudicots
- Clade: Rosids
- Order: Fabales
- Family: Polygalaceae
- Genus: Polygala
- Species: P. persicariifolia

Binomial name
- Polygala persicariifolia DC.

= Polygala persicariifolia =

Species of flowering plant

Polygala persicariifolia is a species of flowering plant in the milkwort family (Polygalaceae). It is native to east Africa and Asia.
