= Rare species =

Group of organisms that are very uncommon, scarce, or infrequently encountered

A rare species is a group of organisms that are very uncommon, scarce, or infrequently encountered. This designation may be applied to either a plant or animal taxon, and is distinct from the term endangered or threatened. Designation of a rare species may be made by an official body, such as a national government, state, or province. The term more commonly appears without reference to specific criteria. The International Union for Conservation of Nature does not normally make such designations, but may use the term in scientific discussion.

Rarity rests on a specific species being represented by a small number of organisms worldwide, usually fewer than 10,000. However, a species having a very narrow endemic range or fragmented habitat also influences the concept. Almost 75% of known species can be classified as "rare".

Rare species are species with small populations. Many will move into the endangered or vulnerable category if the negative factors affecting them continue to operate. Well-known examples of rare species - because these are large terrestrial animals - include the Himalayan brown bear, Fennec fox, Wild Asiatic buffalo, or the Hornbill.

They are not endangered yet, but classified as "at risk", although the frontier between these categories is increasingly difficult to draw given the general paucity of data on rare species. This is especially the case in the ocean where many 'rare' species not seen for decades may well have gone extinct unnoticed, if they are not already on the verge of extinction like the Mexican Vaquita.

A species may be endangered or vulnerable, but not considered rare if it has a large, dispersed population. IUCN uses the term "rare" as a designation for species found in isolated geographical locations. Rare species are generally considered threatened because a small population size is less likely to recover from ecological disasters.

Rare plants can be classified based on the size and distribution of their populations. Some species may be rare because they consist of only a few individuals, are confined to a limited geographic area, or both. Certain rare plants are found sparsely distributed across a wide area. Others might have a large number of individuals that are concentrated in a very small area, such as a single county or canyon. The rarest plants typically have both a small number of individuals and a very limited geographic range.

Assessments of the status of rare plants are conducted using the best available data and consider various factors, including:

- Total number of occurrences and the condition of these populations
- Population size
- Extent of range and area occupied
- Trends in population size and distribution over the short and long term
- Nature, severity, and urgency of threats
- Number of occurrences that are protected and actively managed
- Intrinsic vulnerability of the species
- Specificity to environmental conditions

A rare plant's legal status can be observed through the USDA's Plants Database.

== See also ==
- Abundance (ecology)
- Biodiversity Action Plan
- Common species
- Critical depensation
- Endangered Species Recovery Plan
- Endling – What some of the species on this list are categorised as such as the Fernandina island tortoise and loneliest palm.
- List of cryptids – For species officially declared extinct with unconfirmed sightings such as the thylacine and megalodon
- Rare Species Conservation Centre
