= Polygala francisci =

Conservation status
- Vulnerable (IUCN 3.1)

Scientific classification
- Kingdom: Plantae
- Clade: Embryophytes
- Clade: Tracheophytes
- Clade: Spermatophytes
- Clade: Angiosperms
- Clade: Eudicots
- Clade: Rosids
- Order: Fabales
- Family: Polygalaceae
- Genus: Polygala
- Species: P. francisci

Binomial name
- Polygala francisci Exell

Species of flowering plant

Polygala francisci is a species of plant in the family Polygalaceae. It is endemic to the edges of woodlands in southern Mozambique at elevations of 20 to 60 metres (66 to 200 ft) above sea level. The plant is a perennial. It has violet flowers in 1.5 centimetre racemes containing 1 to 5 of them. Each flower has 8 stamens. In 2019, the International Union for Conservation of Nature (IUCN) classified the species as vulnerable on its Red List due to deforestation and agriculture. According to the IUCN, much of the area inhabited by the plant is already used for or has potential to be used for agriculture.
