= Common species =

Common species and uncommon species are designations used in ecology to describe the population status of a species. Commonness is closely related to abundance. Abundance refers to the frequency with which a species is found in controlled samples; in contrast, species are defined as common or uncommon based on their overall presence in the environment. A species may be locally abundant without being common.

However, "common" and "uncommon" are also sometimes used to describe levels of abundance, with a common species being less abundant than an abundant species, while an uncommon species is more abundant than a rare species.

Common species are frequently regarded as being at low risk of extinction simply because they exist in large numbers, and hence their conservation status is often overlooked. While this is broadly logical, there are several cases of once common species being driven to extinction such as the passenger pigeon and the Rocky Mountain locust, which numbered in the billions and trillions respectively before their demise. Moreover, a small proportional decline in a common species results in the loss of a large number of individuals, and the contribution to ecosystem function that those individuals represented. A recent paper argued that because common species shape ecosystems, contribute disproportionately to ecosystem functioning, and can show rapid population declines, conservation should look more closely at how the trade-off between species extinctions and the depletion of populations.

== See also ==
- Rare species
- Abundance (ecology)
