= Polygala magdalenae =

Scientific classification
- Kingdom: Plantae
- Clade: Tracheophytes
- Clade: Angiosperms
- Clade: Eudicots
- Clade: Rosids
- Order: Fabales
- Family: Polygalaceae
- Genus: Polygala
- Species: P. magdalenae

Binomial name
- Polygala magdalenae Brandegee

Species of flowering plant

Polygala magdalenae is a species of flowering plant in the family Polygalaceae. It is native and endemic to Northwest Mexico, namely the state of Baja California Sur.

== Taxonomy ==
The species was first described by Townshend Stith Brandegee in 1911 under its current binomial name.

=== Etymology ===
The Latin specific epithet magdalenae means "of Magdalena", which refers to one of its geographical locations, which is Magdalena Bay, where it can be found in its natural habitat.

== Description ==
Stems are woody at the base, with limited branching, typically pubescent and striated, reaching up to 10-30 cm tall.

Leaves are oblong-obovate to linear-lanceolate depending on location, pubescent. Leaf petiole is 1-2 cm long and 2-8 mm wide.

Flowers are formed in terminal clusters, flower sepals lanceolate and pubescent. Flowers typically contain 7 stamens.

Fruits are in form of oblong, broadly marginated capsules, with their apex being emarginately pubescent, measuring 7 mm in length and 6 mm in width.

Seeds are 4 mm long, also hairy and compressed.
