= Polygala sekhukhuniensis =

Scientific classification
- Kingdom: Plantae
- Clade: Tracheophytes
- Clade: Angiosperms
- Clade: Eudicots
- Clade: Rosids
- Order: Fabales
- Family: Polygalaceae
- Genus: Polygala
- Species: P. sekhukhuniensis

Binomial name
- Polygala sekhukhuniensis Retief, S.J.Siebert & A.E.van Wyk

Species of flowering plant

Polygala sekhukhuniensis is a species of flowering plant in the milkwort family (Polygalaceae). It is endemic to South Africa.
