= Polygala crassitesta =

Scientific classification
- Kingdom: Plantae
- Clade: Tracheophytes
- Clade: Angiosperms
- Clade: Eudicots
- Clade: Rosids
- Order: Fabales
- Family: Polygalaceae
- Genus: Polygala
- Species: P. crassitesta

Binomial name
- Polygala crassitesta R.A.Kerrigan

Species of flowering plant

Polygala crassitesta is a species of flowering plant in the family Polygalaceae. It is endemic to Western Australia, the Northern Territory and Queensland.
