= Polygala youngii =

Scientific classification
- Kingdom: Plantae
- Clade: Embryophytes
- Clade: Tracheophytes
- Clade: Spermatophytes
- Clade: Angiosperms
- Clade: Eudicots
- Clade: Rosids
- Order: Fabales
- Family: Polygalaceae
- Genus: Polygala
- Species: P. youngii

Binomial name
- Polygala youngii Exell

Species of flowering plant

Polygala youngii is a plant species in the milkwort family (Polygalaceae). It is native to boggy highlands and grasslands 1,200 to 1,350 metres (3,940 to 4,430 ft) above sea level in Angola and western Zambia. It is a 40 to 60 cm (16 to 24 in)-tall annual herb with very thin stems. It produces linear leaves with needle-like tips which are 10 to 12 centimetres (3.9 to 4.7 in) long and 0.5 centimetres (0.20 in) wide. The flowers it produces may be yellowish, pink, or blue.
