= Polygala multiflora =

Scientific classification
- Kingdom: Plantae
- Clade: Embryophytes
- Clade: Tracheophytes
- Clade: Spermatophytes
- Clade: Angiosperms
- Clade: Eudicots
- Clade: Rosids
- Order: Fabales
- Family: Polygalaceae
- Genus: Polygala
- Species: P. multiflora

Binomial name
- Polygala multiflora Poir.

Species of flowering plant

Polygala multiflora is a plant species in the milkwort family (Polygalaceae). It is native to Western Africa. It is an erect plant and is considered to be "probably 2 to 3 feet (0.61 to 0.91 m)" though it can grow up to 6 feet (1.8 m) tall. Its stems are puberlouous (covered with soft hairs) and its leaves are 2 to 3 inches (5.1 to 7.6 cm) long and 1/6 inch (0.42 cm) wide. The flowers it produces are blue or purple. It was first written about was part of the Encyclopédie méthodique Botanique in 1804 by Jean Louis Marie Poiret.
