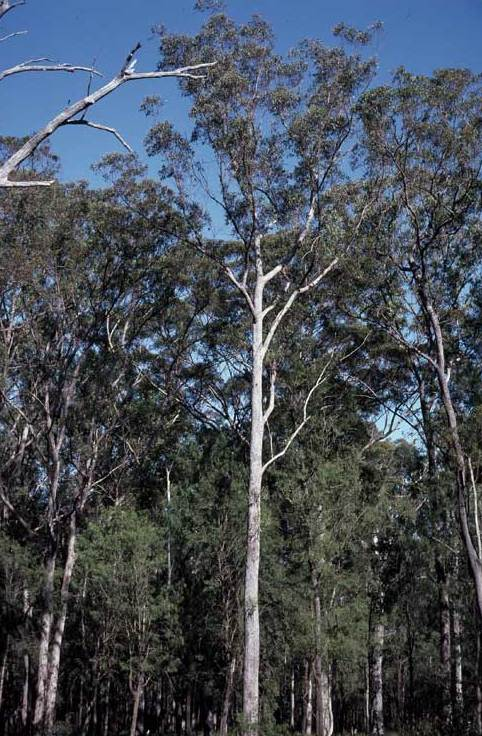
- Eucalyptus sphaerocarpa near Blackdown

Scientific classification
- Kingdom: Plantae
- Clade: Embryophytes
- Clade: Tracheophytes
- Clade: Spermatophytes
- Clade: Angiosperms
- Clade: Eudicots
- Clade: Rosids
- Order: Myrtales
- Family: Myrtaceae
- Genus: Eucalyptus
- Species: E. sphaerocarpa

Binomial name
- Eucalyptus sphaerocarpa L.A.S.Johnson & Blaxell

= Eucalyptus sphaerocarpa =

Blackdown stringybark

Species of eucalyptus

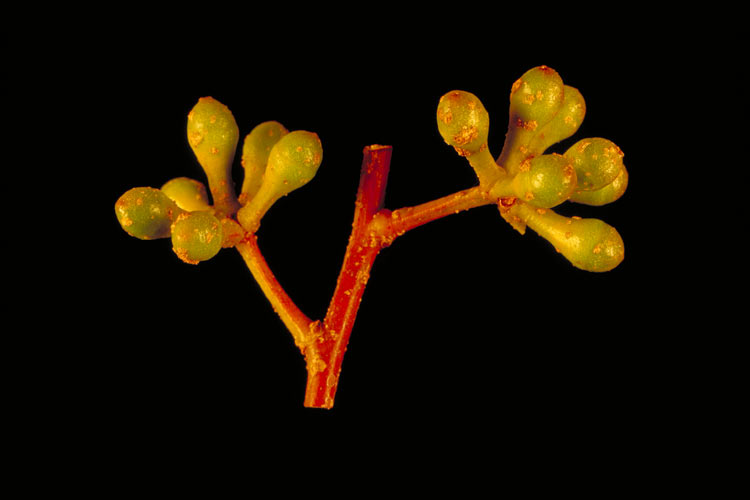
Flower buds

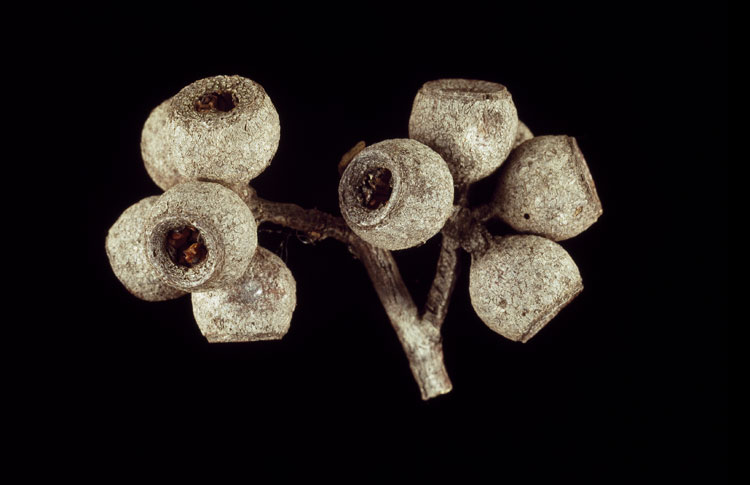
Fruit

Eucalyptus sphaerocarpa, commonly known as the Blackdown stringybark, is a species of tall forest tree that is endemic to Queensland. It has rough, stringy bark on the trunk and branches, lance-shaped to curved adult leaves, flower buds in groups of seven, nine or eleven, white flowers and shortened spherical fruit.

== Description ==
Eucalyptus sphaerocarpa is a tree that typically grows to a height of 45 m (148 ft) and forms a lignotuber. It has rough, grey to brownish, stringy bark on the trunk and branches. Young plants and coppice regrowth have stems that are square in cross-section and dull greyish green leaves that are paler on the lower surface, elliptic to lance-shaped, 90–190 mm (3.5–7.5 in) long and 25–60 mm (0.98–2.36 in) wide. Adult leaves are the same shade of green to greyish on both sides, lance-shaped to curved, 75–150 mm (3.0–5.9 in) long and 12–35 mm (0.47–1.38 in) wide, tapering to a petiole 10–37 mm (0.39–1.46 in) long. The flower buds are arranged in leaf axils in groups of seven, nine or eleven on a flattened, unbranched peduncle 10–18 mm (0.39–0.71 in) long, the individual buds on pedicels 3–6 mm (0.12–0.24 in) long. Mature buds are oval, 7–9 mm (0.28–0.35 in) long and 4–5 mm (0.16–0.20 in) wide with a conical operculum. Flowering has been recorded in September and the flowers are white. The fruit is a woody, shortened spherical capsule 9–12 mm (0.35–0.47 in) long and 10–13 mm (0.39–0.51 in) wide with the valves below rim level.

== Taxonomy and naming ==
Eucalyptus sphaerocarpa was first formally described in 1972 by Lawrie Johnson and Donald Blaxell in Contributions from the New South Wales Herbarium from specimens collected from the Blackdown Tableland. The specific epithet (sphaerocarpa) is derived from ancient Greek words meaning "spherical" and "fruit", referring to the shape of the fruit.

== Distribution and habitat ==
Blackdown stringybark grows in tall, open forest and is restricted to the Blackdown Tableland west of Rockhampton.

== Conservation status ==
This eucalypt is classified as "least concern" under the Queensland Government Nature Conservation Act 1992.

== See also ==
- List of Eucalyptus species
