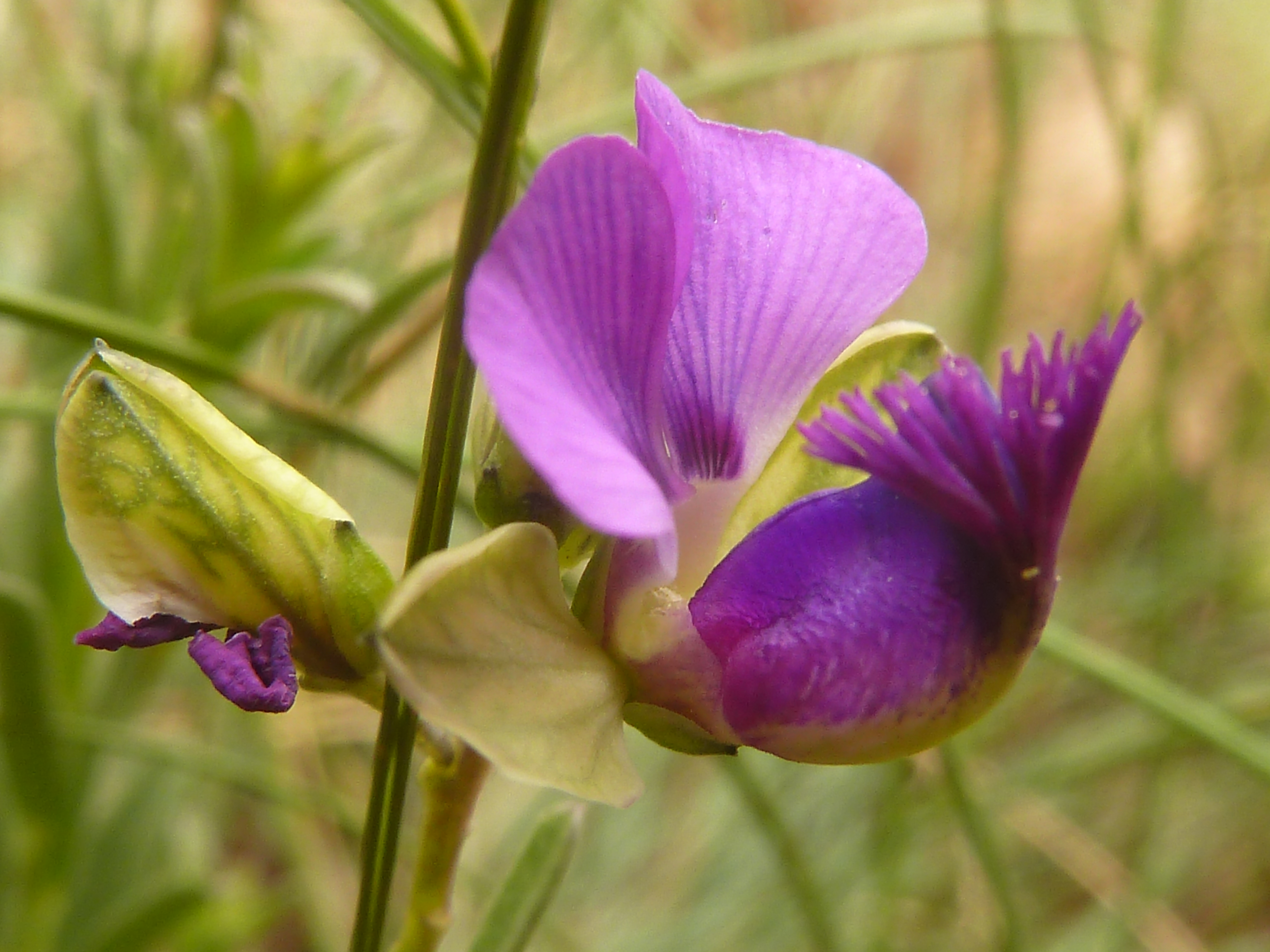

Scientific classification
- Kingdom: Plantae
- Clade: Tracheophytes
- Clade: Angiosperms
- Clade: Eudicots
- Clade: Rosids
- Order: Fabales
- Family: Polygalaceae
- Genus: Polygala
- Species: P. rehmannii

Binomial name
- Polygala rehmannii Chodat

Synonyms
- Polygala tenuifolia

= Polygala rehmannii =

Species of flowering plant

Polygala rehmannii is a species of flowering plant in the milkwort family (Polygalaceae). It is endemic to areas with an altitude below 1,160 metres (3,810 ft) in Southern Africa. It was first described by Robert Chodat in 1893.

== Description ==
The species is a perennial herb with a height between 10 and 30 centimetres (3.9 and 11.8 in) growing from a woody rootstock. The leaves are 10 to 25 millimetres (0.39 to 0.98 in) long and have rounded ends. Just like the stem, the leaves are glabrous. The flowers the plant produces are blue or greenish-blue.

== Conservation ==
The Red List of South African Plants list the species as of least conservation concern.
