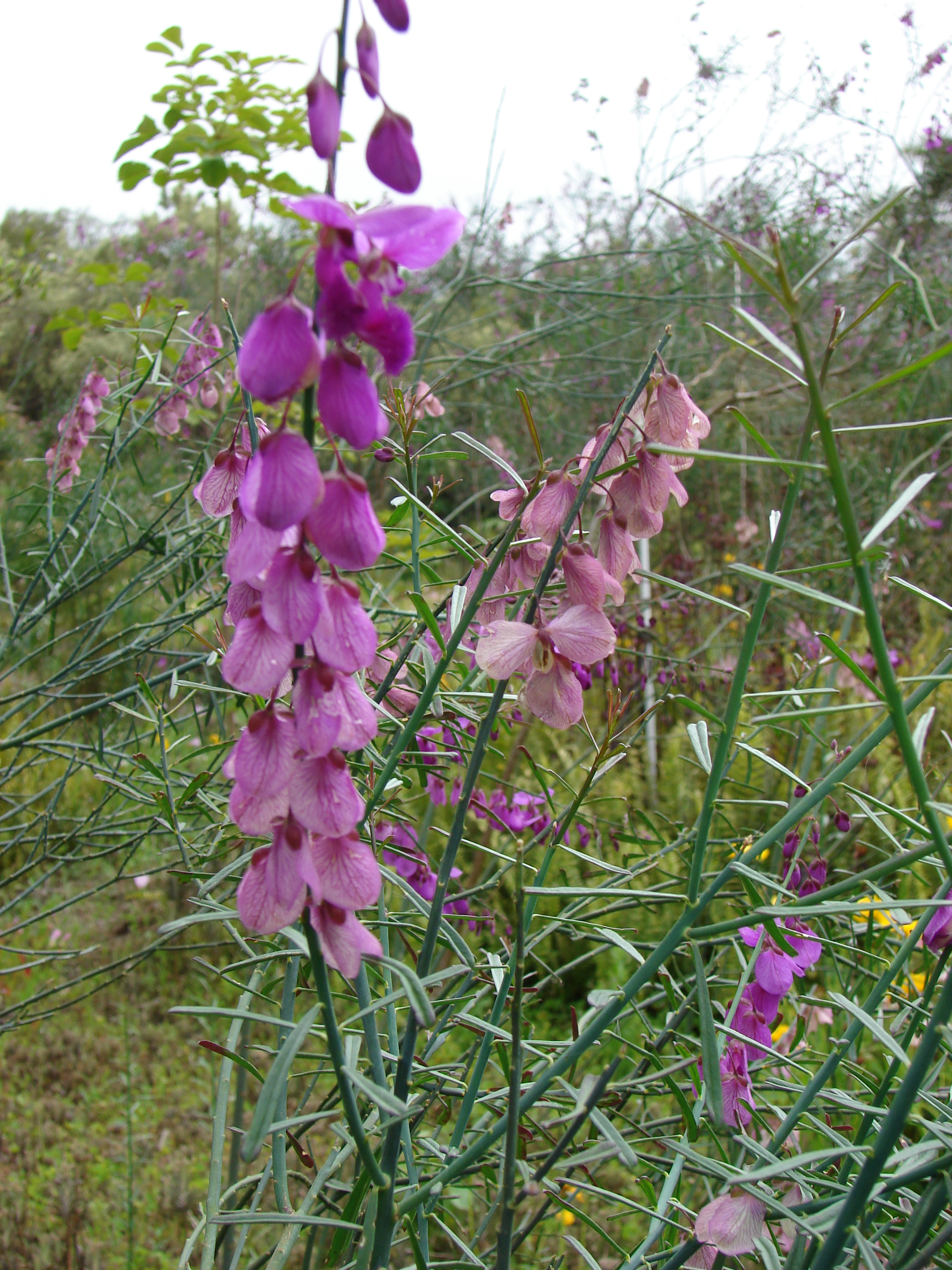

Scientific classification
- Kingdom: Plantae
- Clade: Tracheophytes
- Clade: Angiosperms
- Clade: Eudicots
- Clade: Rosids
- Order: Fabales
- Family: Polygalaceae
- Genus: Polygala
- Species: P. virgata

Binomial name
- Polygala virgata Thunb.

= Polygala virgata =

Species of flowering plant

Polygala virgata is a species of flowering plant in the milkwort family (Polygalaceae) native to eastern and southern Africa. Its common names include broom milkwort, milkwort, polygala and purple broom.

== Description ==
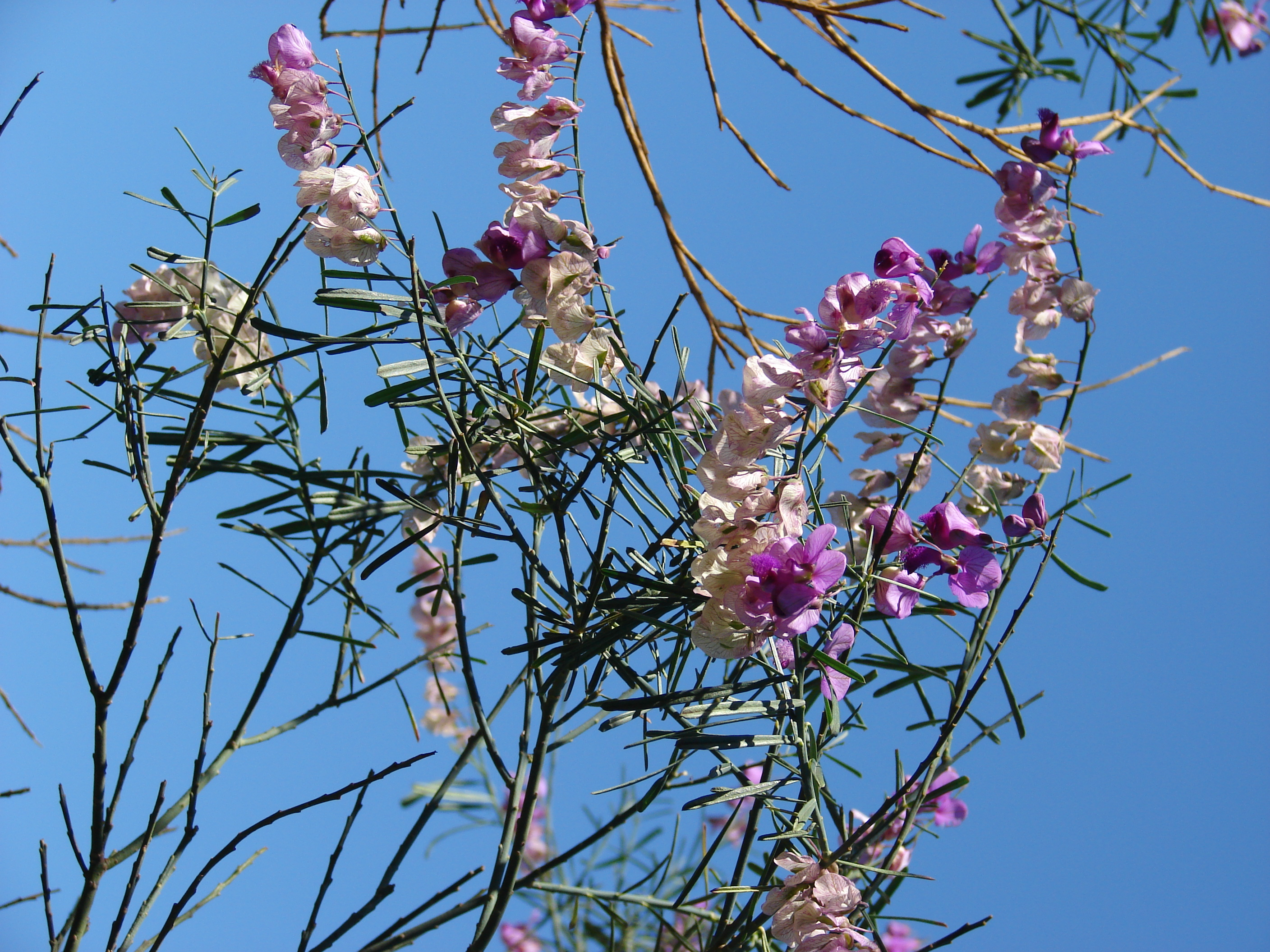
Flowers and leaves

It is an erect, evergreen shrub that normally reaches 1–3 m in height with a single stem formed at the base and slender hairless branches at the top. The lower branches are leafless with unshapely scars from fallen leaves; stems are thinly hairy.

Leaves are linear or oblanceolate to slender to somewhat egg-shaped, around 1–5 cm long to 1–5 mm broad, and are just slightly hairy. The simple leaves are alternately arranged on younger branches, where they generally fall before blooming.

=== Inflorescences ===
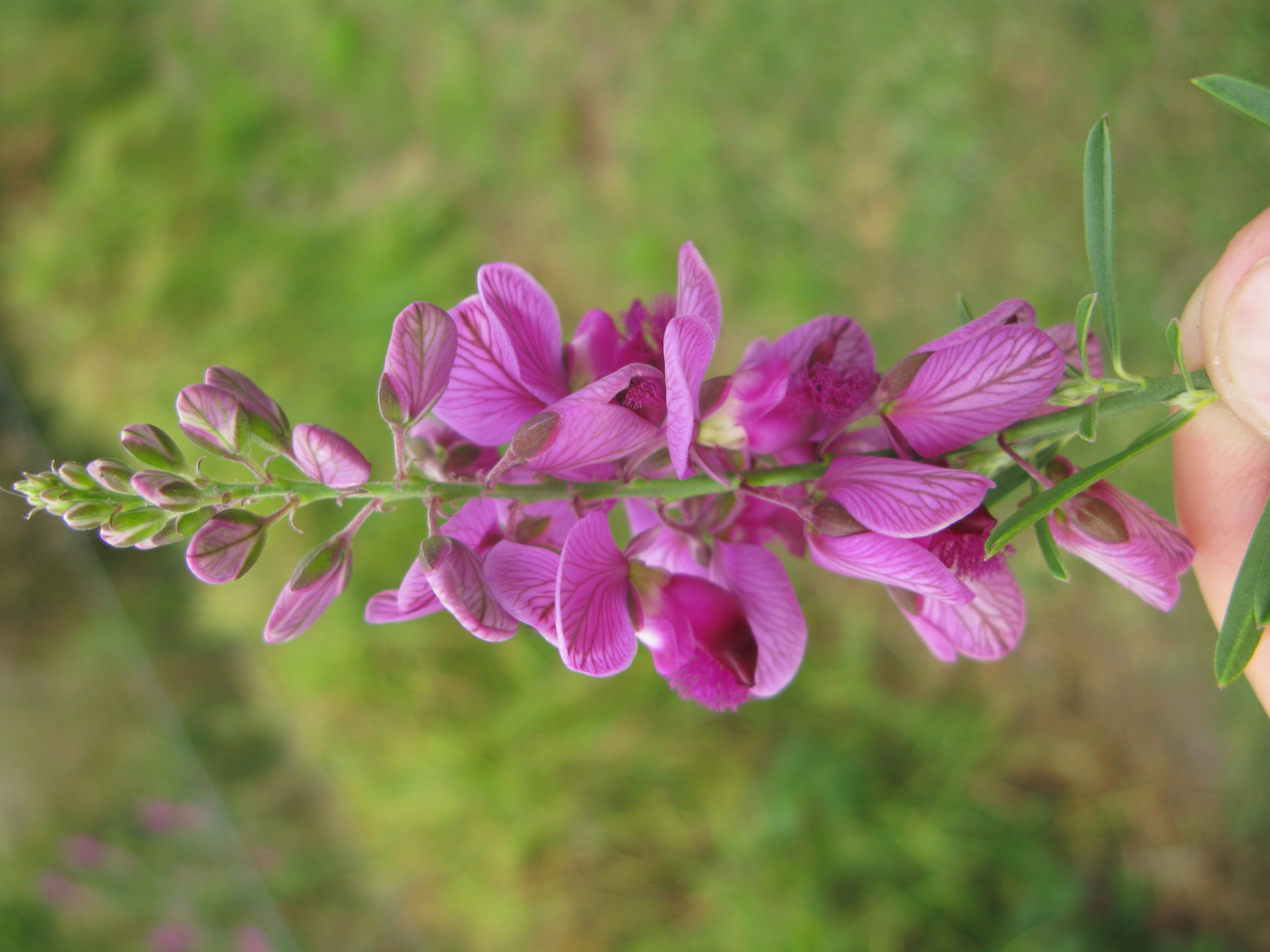
Flowerhead

Racemes are terminal and in upper axils, 4–12 cm in length, where they generally develop terminal panicles; pedicels are 5–10 mm in length. The showy flowers are 12–15 mm in length, purple to light lilac in colour, which occur from late winter to spring. The outermost sepals are 3–5 mm in length; the wing sepals are petaloid, 10–15 mm in length. The keel is shorter than the side petals, tufted with two delicately branched outgrowths that are 4–5 mm in length.

The flowers look similar to that of a pea family, though are different – The purple tuft of hairs is a typical feature to identify all polygalas.

== Distribution ==
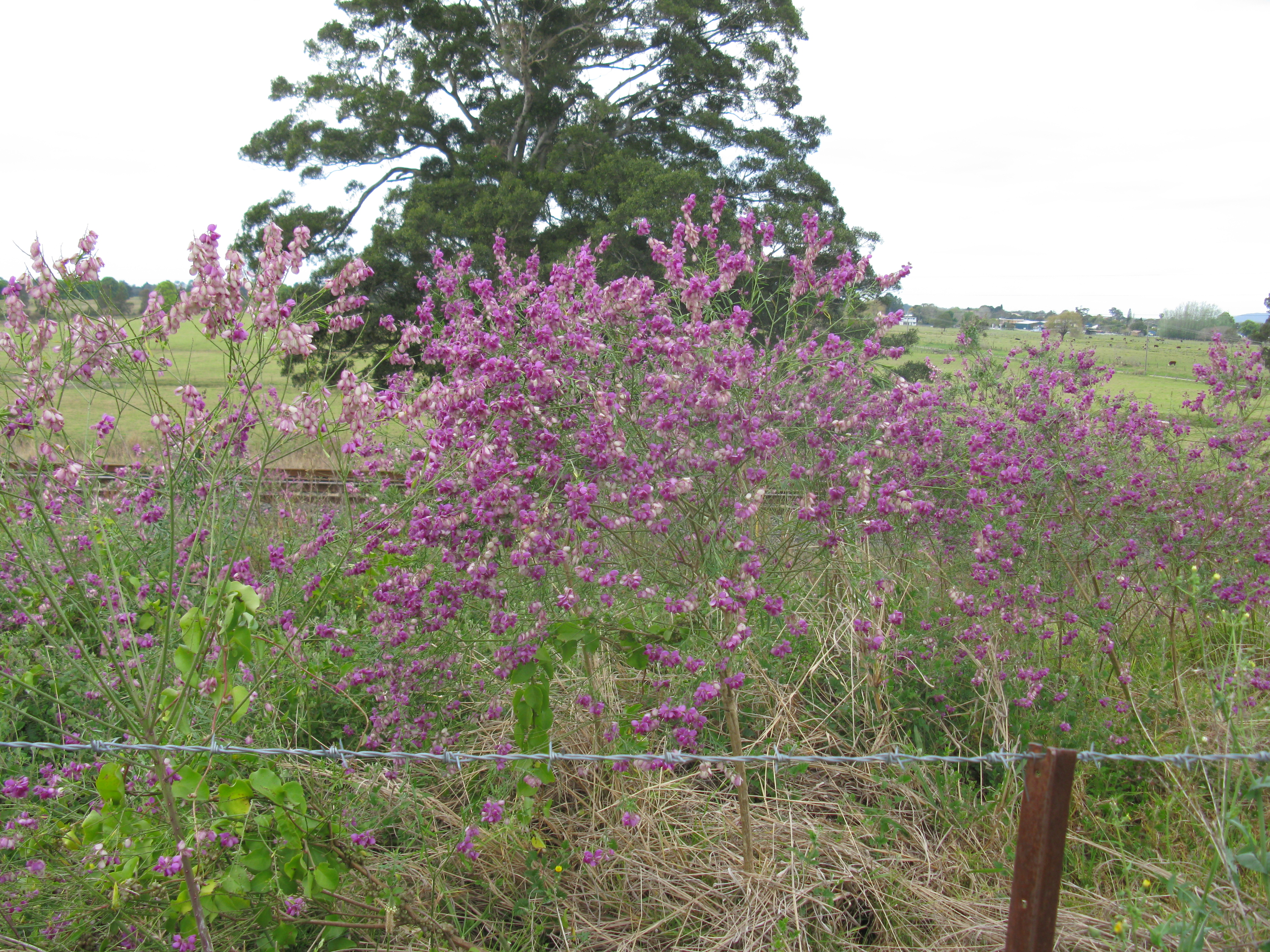
Growing on disturbed sites

In South Africa they occur from Cape Town, through KwaZulu-Natal to Mpumalanga. In the rest of Africa, the tree is native to the Democratic Republic of the Congo, Eswatini, Lesotho, Malawi, Mozambique, Namibia, Tanzania, Zambia and Zimbabwe.

The plant has escaped cultivation as a garden ornamental, where it became naturalized in the coastal districts of eastern New South Wales (from southern Sydney to Myall Lakes), central Queensland and in southern Victoria, and as well as New Zealand.

=== Habitat ===
Tolerating drought, wind and mild frost, they grow naturally on lower slopes and borders of shaggy hillsides and along stream banks, and also in sandstone, clay or limestone slopes and on forest margins. They are self-seeding, where small seedlings sprout near the parent plant after the first flowering season. The plant is rather short-lived.
