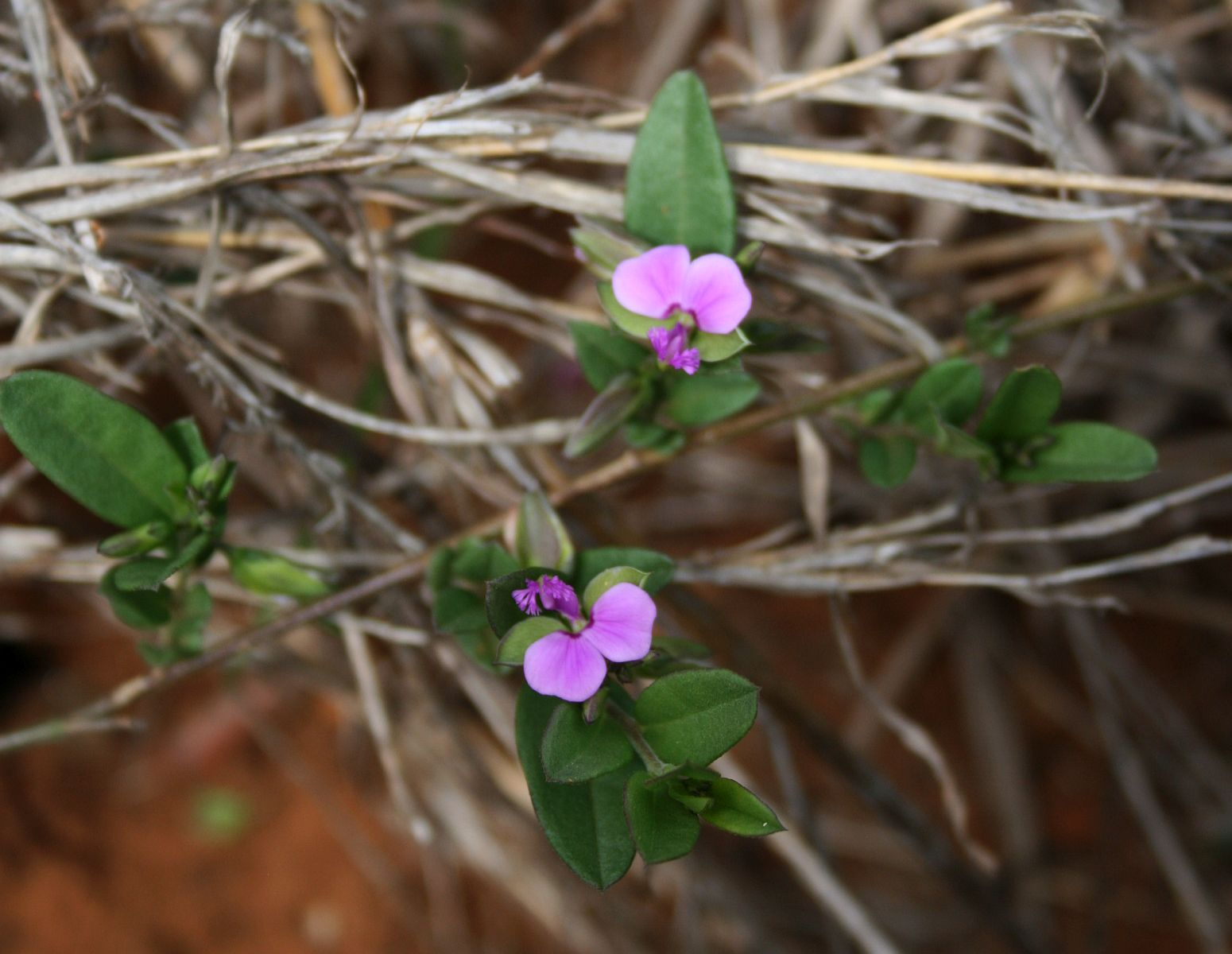

Scientific classification
- Kingdom: Plantae
- Clade: Tracheophytes
- Clade: Angiosperms
- Clade: Eudicots
- Clade: Rosids
- Order: Fabales
- Family: Polygalaceae
- Genus: Polygala
- Species: P. serpentaria

Binomial name
- Polygala serpentaria Eckl. & Zeyh.

= Polygala serpentaria =

Species of flowering plant

Polygala serpentaria is a species of flowering plant in the milkwort family (Polygalaceae). It is native to South Africa and Eswatini.
