= Polygala nyikensis =

Scientific classification
- Kingdom: Plantae
- Clade: Embryophytes
- Clade: Tracheophytes
- Clade: Spermatophytes
- Clade: Angiosperms
- Clade: Eudicots
- Clade: Rosids
- Order: Fabales
- Family: Polygalaceae
- Genus: Polygala
- Species: P. nyikensis

Binomial name
- Polygala nyikensis Exell

Species of flowering plant

Polygala nyikensis is a plant species in the family Polygalaceae. It is endemic to grasslands at altitudes between 1,300 and 2,500 metres (4,300 and 8,200 ft) in Malawi, Tanzania, and Zambia. It is a perennial herb with short, crisped, pubescent stems 6 to 14 centimetres (2.4 to 5.5 in) spreading from a wood rootstock. It produces flowers with a pale mauve or magenta colour. The plant is used by the people native to the area to treat fungal skin problems and the root was shown to exert antifungal activity.
