= Polygala irregularis =

Scientific classification
- Kingdom: Plantae
- Clade: Embryophytes
- Clade: Tracheophytes
- Clade: Spermatophytes
- Clade: Angiosperms
- Clade: Eudicots
- Clade: Rosids
- Order: Fabales
- Family: Polygalaceae
- Genus: Polygala
- Species: P. irregularis

Binomial name
- Polygala irregularis Boiss.

Synonyms
- Polygala arabica Boiss. Polygala dictyoptera Boiss. Polygala hagerupii Exell; Polygala irregularis var. aegyptiaca Chodat ex Täckh. & Boulos

Species of flowering plant

Polygala irregularis is a species of flowering plant in the family Polygalaceae. It is a perennial herb with a height up to 60 centimetres (24 in), though the average ranges from 17 to 34 centimetres (6.7 to 13.4 in). It produces lilac to reddish-brown flowers. It is native to grasslands and sandy areas of Northern Africa, the Middle East, and South Asia with altitudes below 500 metres (1,600 ft).
