= Polygala xanthina =

Scientific classification
- Kingdom: Plantae
- Clade: Embryophytes
- Clade: Tracheophytes
- Clade: Spermatophytes
- Clade: Angiosperms
- Clade: Eudicots
- Clade: Rosids
- Order: Fabales
- Family: Polygalaceae
- Genus: Polygala
- Species: P. xanthina

Binomial name
- Polygala xanthina Chodat

Species of flowering plant

Polygala xanthina is a plant species in the family Polygalaceae. It is an annual herb which has a height of between 30 and 50 centimetres (12 and 20 in). The colour of its flowers have been described as greenish purple, bluish, yellowish, or pinkish. It is endemic to grasslands, woodlands, and seasonal swamps in Tropical Africa within altitudes between 1,000 and 1,800 metres (3,300 and 5,900 ft).
