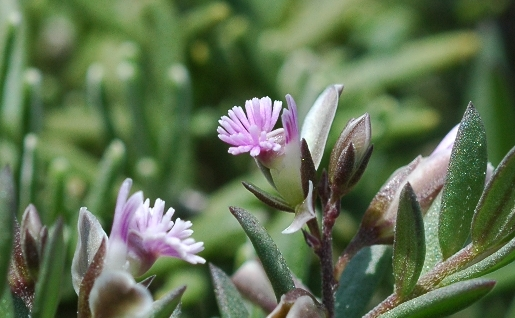

Scientific classification
- Kingdom: Plantae
- Clade: Tracheophytes
- Clade: Angiosperms
- Clade: Eudicots
- Clade: Rosids
- Order: Fabales
- Family: Polygalaceae
- Genus: Polygala
- Species: P. monspeliaca

Binomial name
- Polygala monspeliaca L.

= Polygala monspeliaca =

Species of plant

Polygala monspeliaca is a species of annual herb in the family Polygalaceae. They have a self-supporting growth form and simple leaves. Individuals can grow to 5 cm.

== Sources ==
This article incorporates text from a free content work. Licensed under CC0 (license statement/permission). Text taken from Polygala monspeliaca. Encyclopedia of Life.
