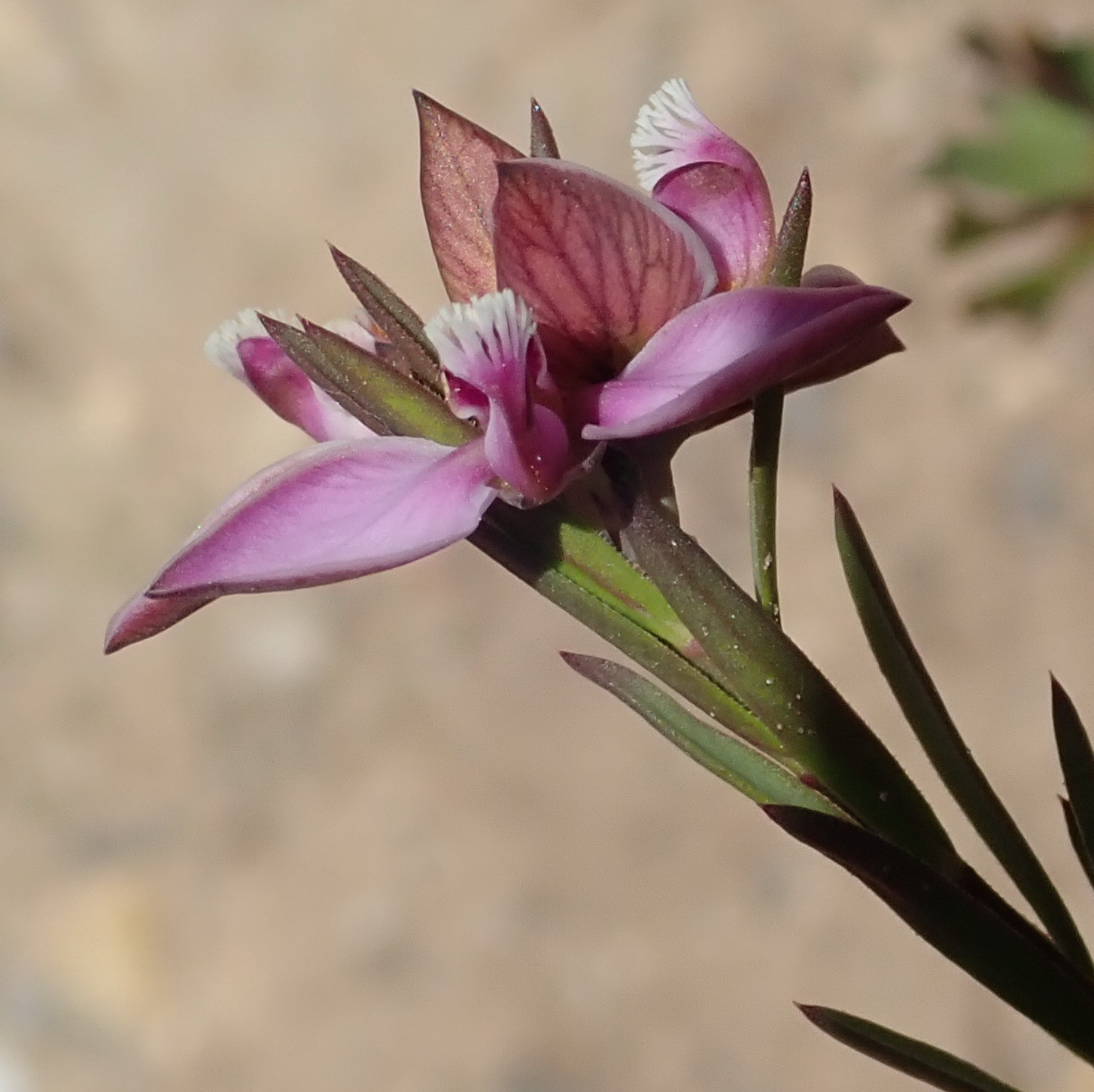

Scientific classification
- Kingdom: Plantae
- Clade: Tracheophytes
- Clade: Angiosperms
- Clade: Eudicots
- Clade: Rosids
- Order: Fabales
- Family: Polygalaceae
- Genus: Polygala
- Species: P. umbellata

Binomial name
- Polygala umbellata L. (1771)

= Polygala umbellata =

Species of flowering plant

Polygala umbellata is a species of flowering plant in the milkwort family (Polygalaceae). It is endemic to the Cape Provinces of South Africa.
