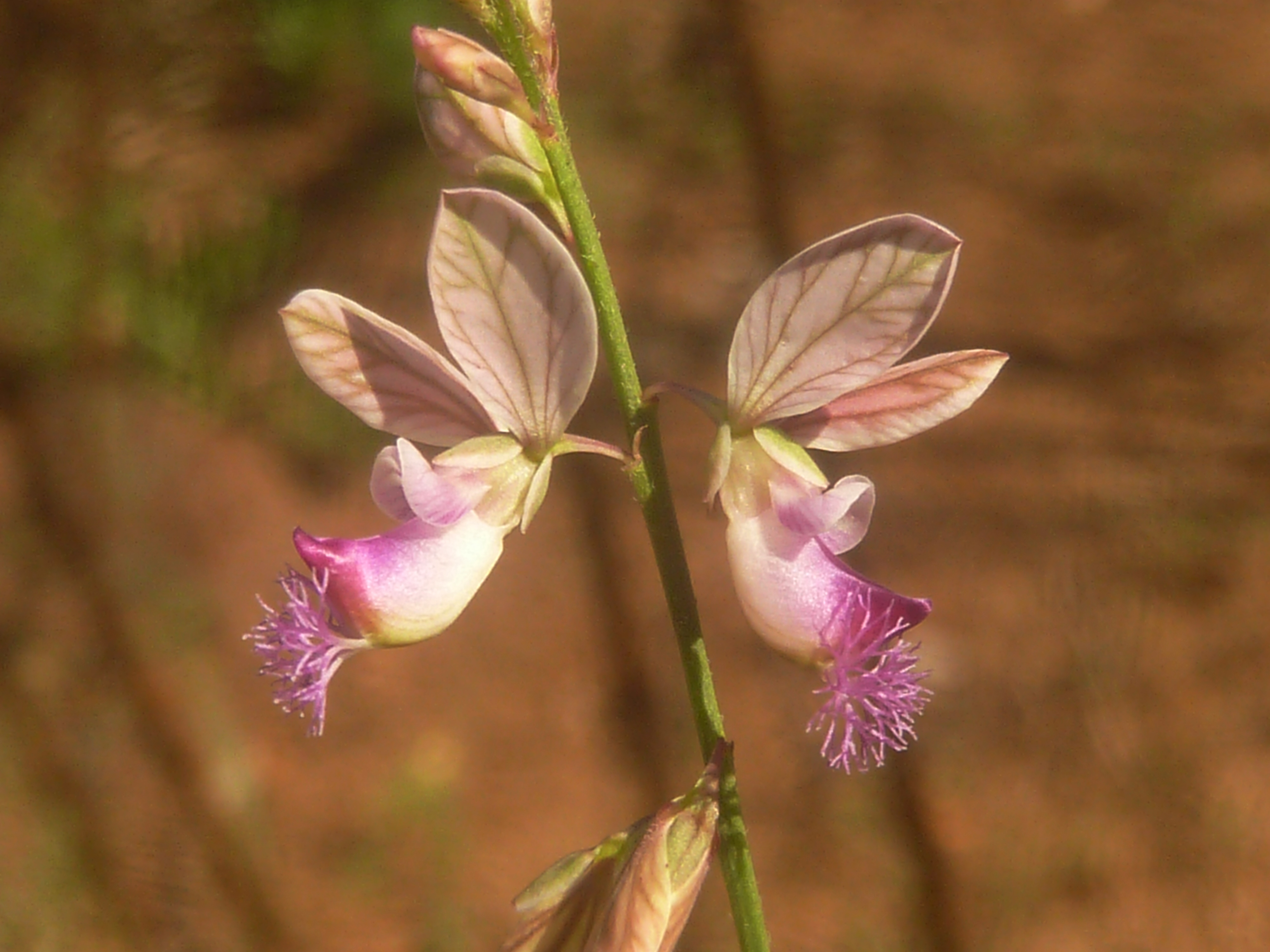
- Polygala hottentotta in Pretoria.

Scientific classification
- Kingdom: Plantae
- Clade: Tracheophytes
- Clade: Angiosperms
- Clade: Eudicots
- Clade: Rosids
- Order: Fabales
- Family: Polygalaceae
- Genus: Polygala
- Species: P. hottentotta

Binomial name
- Polygala hottentotta C.Presl

= Polygala hottentotta =

Species of flowering plant

Polygala hottentotta is a species of flowering plant in the milkwort family (Polygalaceae). It is native to South Africa, Namibia, Lesotho, Mozambique, Eswatini, and Zimbabwe.
