= Polygala westii =

Scientific classification
- Kingdom: Plantae
- Clade: Embryophytes
- Clade: Tracheophytes
- Clade: Spermatophytes
- Clade: Angiosperms
- Clade: Eudicots
- Clade: Rosids
- Order: Fabales
- Family: Polygalaceae
- Genus: Polygala
- Species: P. westii

Binomial name
- Polygala westii Exell

Species of flowering plant

Polygala westii is a very rare plant species in the family Polygalaceae. It is an annual herb which is 10 to 12 centimetres (3.9 to 4.7 in) tall and it produces green flowers. It is endemic to southern Africa.
