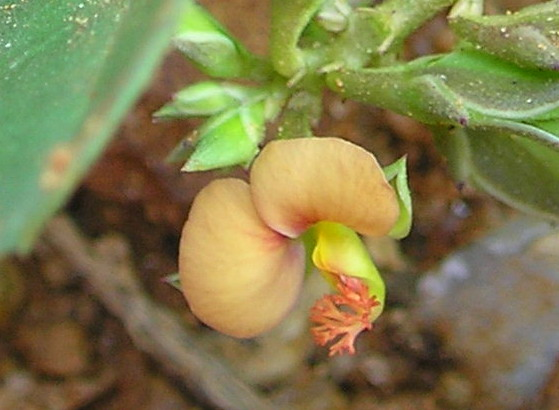

Scientific classification
- Kingdom: Plantae
- Clade: Tracheophytes
- Clade: Angiosperms
- Clade: Eudicots
- Clade: Rosids
- Order: Fabales
- Family: Polygalaceae
- Genus: Polygala
- Species: P. chinensis

Binomial name
- Polygala chinensis L.

= Polygala glomerata =

Species of flowering plant

Polygala chinensis is a species of flowering plant in the family Polygalaceae. It is native to tropical Asia, China and Australia.
