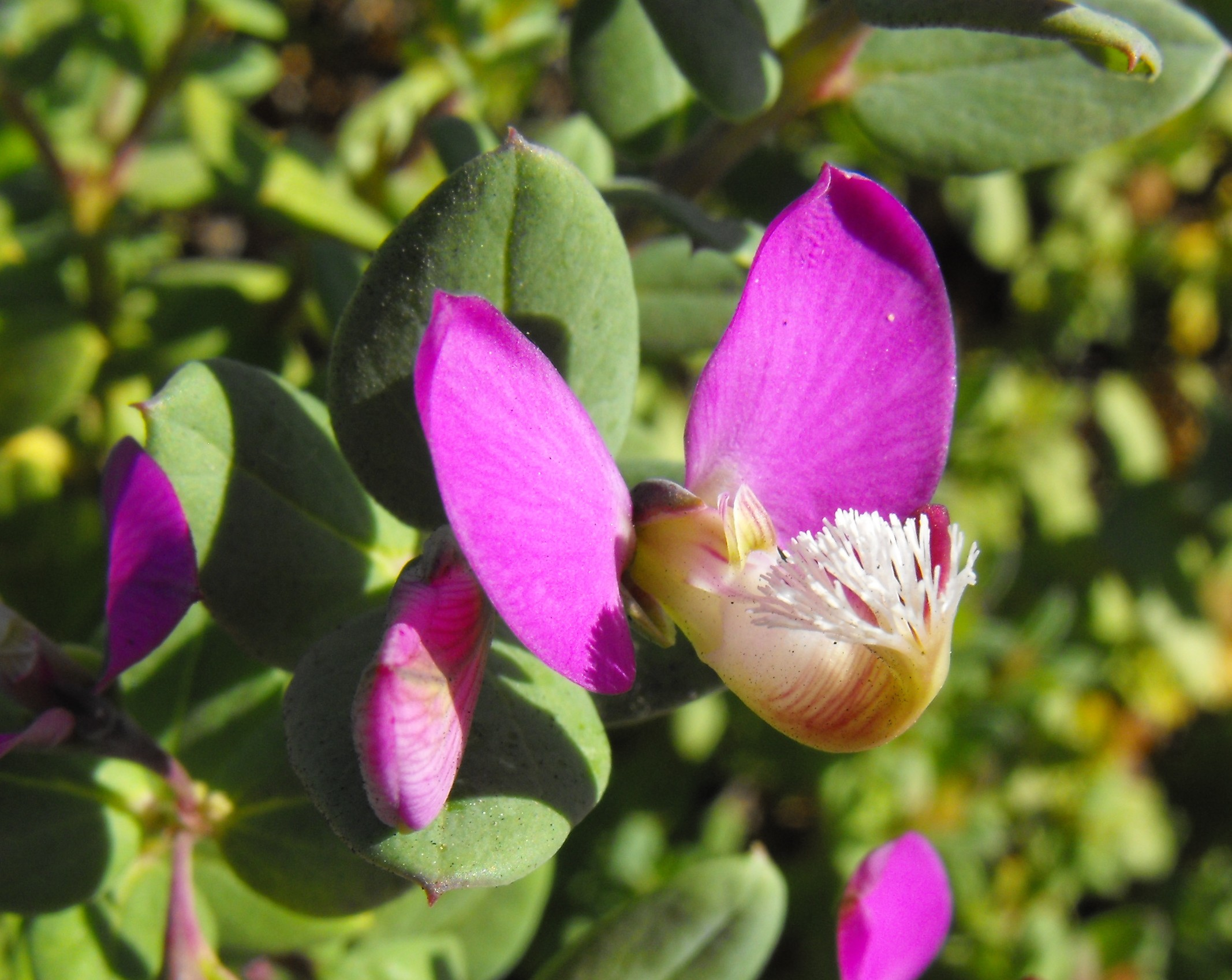
- Polygala fruticosa in cultivation in California

Scientific classification
- Kingdom: Plantae
- Clade: Tracheophytes
- Clade: Angiosperms
- Clade: Eudicots
- Clade: Rosids
- Order: Fabales
- Family: Polygalaceae
- Genus: Polygala
- Species: P. fruticosa

Binomial name
- Polygala fruticosa P.J.Bergius

= Polygala fruticosa =

Sweet Pea Shrub

Species of flowering plant

Polygala fruticosa, the sweet pea shrub, is a species of flowering plant in the milkwort family (Polygalaceae). It is native to Eswatini and Kwazulu-Natal and the Cape Provinces in South Africa. It was first described by Peter Jonas Bergius in 1767. According to the Red List of South African Plants, it is of least ecological concern.
