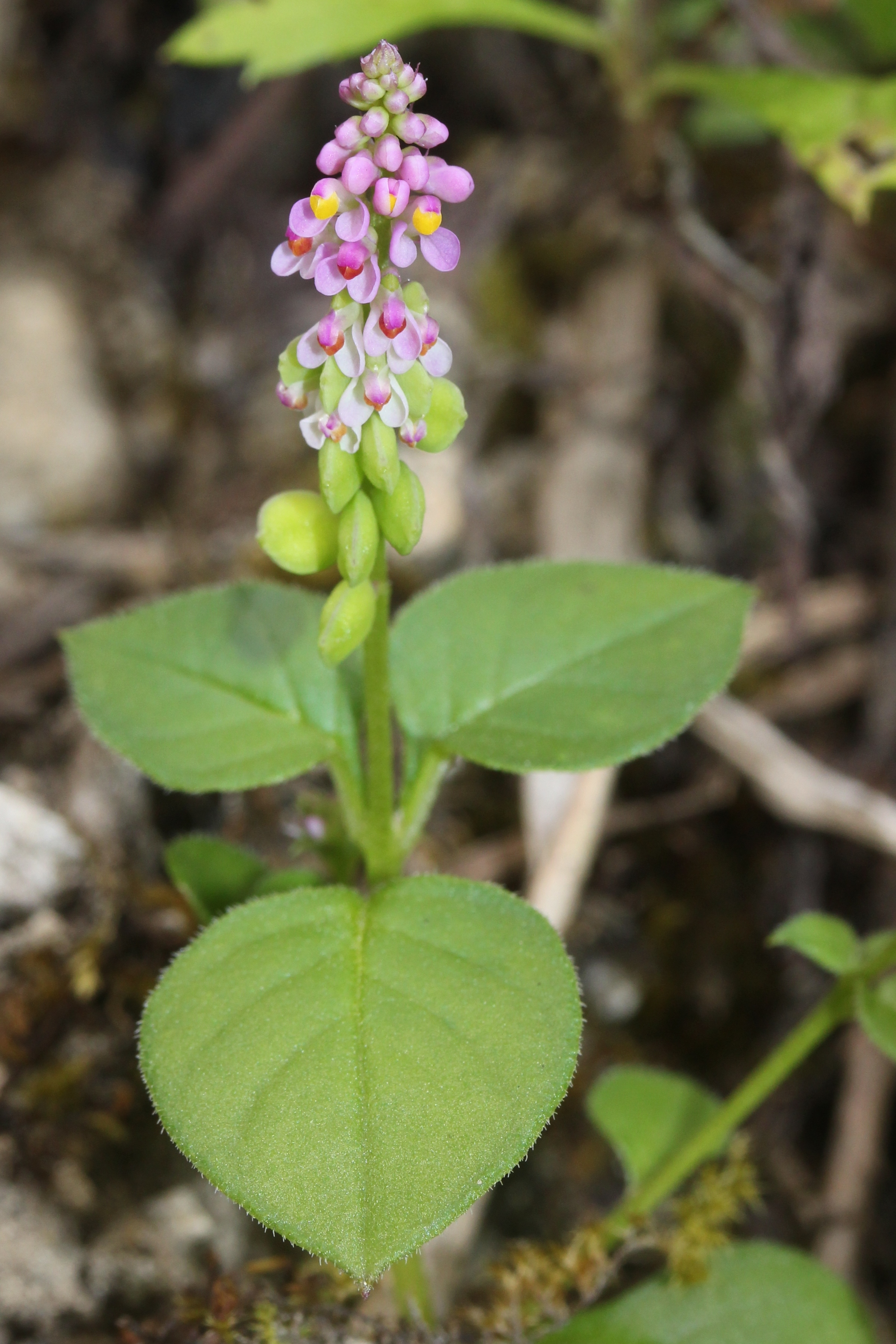

Scientific classification
- Kingdom: Plantae
- Clade: Embryophytes
- Clade: Tracheophytes
- Clade: Spermatophytes
- Clade: Angiosperms
- Clade: Eudicots
- Clade: Rosids
- Order: Fabales
- Family: Polygalaceae
- Genus: Polygala
- Species: P. tatarinowii

Binomial name
- Polygala tatarinowii Regel

= Polygala tatarinowii =

Species of flowering plant

Polygala tatarinowii is a species of flowering plant in the milkwort family (Polygalaceae). It is native to China, Japan, Korea, Russia, Myanmar, the Philippines, Taiwan, and Vietnam. It is a herb that grows up to 15 cm (5.9 in) tall.
