= Polygala bifoliata =

Conservation status
- Least Concern (TPWCA)

Scientific classification
- Kingdom: Plantae
- Clade: Tracheophytes
- Clade: Angiosperms
- Clade: Eudicots
- Clade: Rosids
- Order: Fabales
- Family: Polygalaceae
- Genus: Polygala
- Species: P. bifoliata

Binomial name
- Polygala bifoliata R.A.Kerrigan

Species of flowering plant

Polygala bifoliata is a species of flowering plant in the milkwort family (Polygalaceae), which was first described in 2012 by Raelee Kerrigan. It is endemic to the Northern Territory and Western Australia.

The specific epithet, bifoliata, derives from Latin, bi- ("two") and foliatus ("leaf-bearing"), and refers to the two leaf shapes found on most specimens.

== Description ==
Polygala bifoliata is an annual herb growing up to 15 cm high. It is either prostrate or spreads horizontally with branches growing upwards. It has a covering (indumentum) of curved and straight hairs (sometimes curved hairs only). The stems and leaves are occasionally a dark reddish-purple. It has two leaf shapes: narrow and linear (often on erect branches), and elliptic or ovate leaves (usually on decumbent branches). The inflorescence is usually an axillary raceme exceeding the leaves, and up to 140 mm long. The corolla is purple and the floral appendages have fringed margins. The style is hooked (in a horseshoe-shape at the apex). The capsule has no wing, and is strongly asymmetrical. The seeds are ovoid and 2.0-3.6 mm by1.0-1.8 mm wide and have a covering of fine white hairs over the whole seed and thicker recurved hollow hairs next to the aril. .

== Distribution ==
It is found in the IBRA regions of: the Arnhem Coast, the Arnhem Plateau, the Central Kimberley, the Daly Basin, Dampierland, Darwin Coastal, Gulf Coastal, Gulf Fall and Uplands, Northern Kimberley, Ord Victoria Plain, Pine Creek, Sturt Plateau, Tiwi Cobourg, and Victoria Bonaparte,

== Habitat ==
It is found in eucalyptus woodlands, but rarely in seasonally inundated habitats (which is one of the features which distinguishes it from P. stenosepala).
