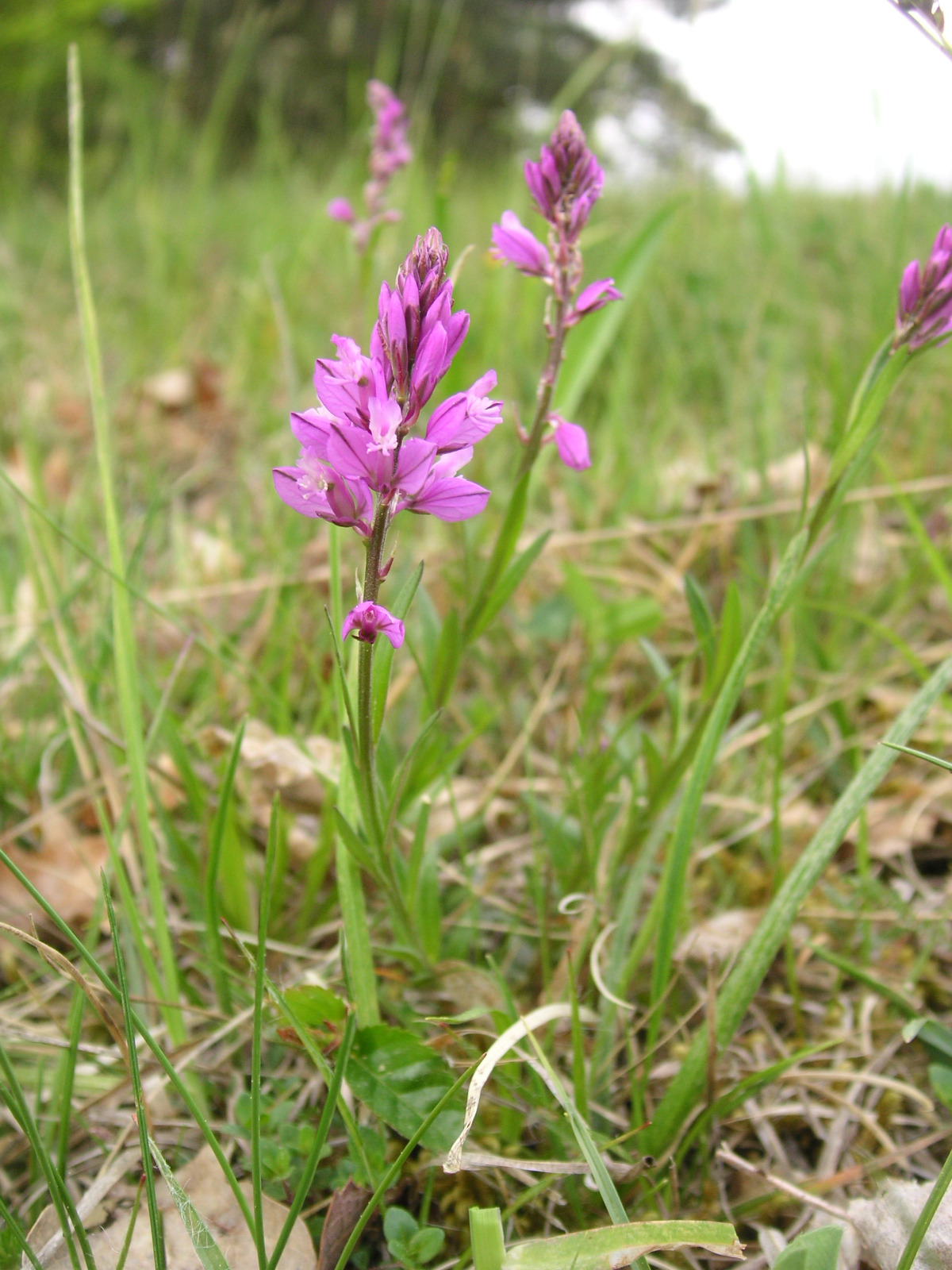

Scientific classification
- Kingdom: Plantae
- Clade: Tracheophytes
- Clade: Angiosperms
- Clade: Eudicots
- Clade: Rosids
- Order: Fabales
- Family: Polygalaceae
- Genus: Polygala
- Species: P. comosa

Binomial name
- Polygala comosa Schkuhr

Synonyms
- Synonyms of Polygala comosa subsp. comosa: Polygala angustata Schur; Polygala comosa var. hybrida (DC.) Petelin; Polygala hybrida DC.; Polygala lejeunei Boreau; Polygala mori Brittinger ex Opiz; Polygala podolica DC.; Polygala vilhelmii Podp.; Polygala wolfgangiana Bess. ex ex Szafer, Kulcz. & Pawl.

= Polygala comosa =

Species of flowering plant

Polygala comosa is a species of flowering plant in the family Polygalaceae. It is native to temperate Eurasia, including most of Europe, Turkey, the Caucasus, Siberia, parts of Central Asia, Xinjiang, and Mongolia.
