= Mulkirigala Raja Maha Vihara =

Buddhist temple in Sri Lanka

- මුල්කිරිගල රජ මහා විහාරය
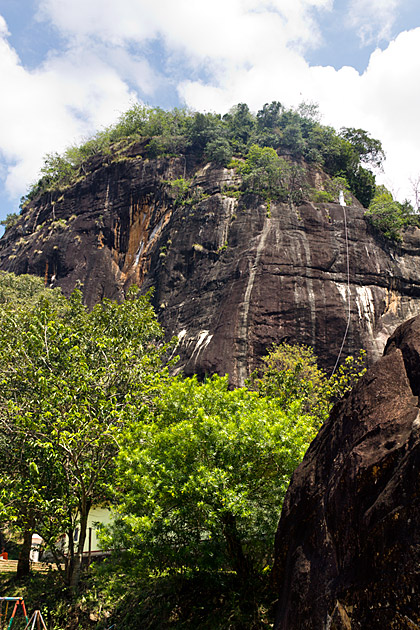

- Location within Sri Lanka

Religion
- Affiliation: Buddhism
- District: Hambantota
- Province: Southern Province

Location
- Location: Mulkirigala, Sri Lanka
- Coordinates: 06°07′22.97″N 80°44′10.95″E

Architecture
- Type: Buddhist Temple
- Style: Cave temple
- Founder: King Saddhatissa

Mulkirigala Raja Maha Vihara (also known as Mulgirigala Raja Maha Vihara) (Sinhala: මුල්කිරිගල රජමහා විහාරය) is an ancient Buddhist temple in Mulkirigala, Sri Lanka. It has been built on a 205 m (673 ft) high natural rock, surrounded with another four rocks known as Benagala, Kondagala, Bisogala and Seelawathiegala. The temple site is located about 2 km (1.2 mi) from the Mulkirigala junction and can be reached from either Dikwella or Tangalle towns. The temple has been formally recognised by the Government as an archaeological site in Sri Lanka. The designation was declared on 8 April 1988 under the government Gazette number 501.

== Name ==
Except its most common name Mulkirigala, the temple is also referred to as Mulgirigala, Muvathitigala, Muhudungiri and Dakkhina Vihara. As the temple has been constructed on a massive natural rock similar to Sigiriya, the site is known as Punchi Seegiriya (Little Sigiriya) by the locals.

As mentioned in the Bodhi Vamsa chronicle, one of the temples known as Giriba Viharaya is where one of the Bo saplings out of 32 saplings germinated from Jaya Sri Maha Bodhi is planted, which was currently identified as Mulkirigala temple. During the Polonnaruwa period this temple was known as Samuddagiri Viharaya, according to the Kamburupitiya Wanaratna Thero, who had read the stone inscription of the pond.

In the 18th century the Mulkirigala rock was called as Adam's Berg by the Dutch. It is believed that Europeans confused Mulkirigala with the Sri Pada (Adam's Peak) with the assumption that tombs of Adam and Eve were located here.

== History ==
According to the ancient chronicle Mahavamsa, the Mulkirigala Vihara was constructed by King Saddhatissa in the third century. After that the temple received royal patronage by numerous successive kings. During the 461-479 AD time period a Stupa was added to the temple by King Datusena and it was further developed by King Kirti Sri Rajasinghe (1747–1782).

This place was visited by Fa-Hien (Soo-Ho-To). He wrote "There is in it the place where Sakra, Ruler of Devas, in a former age, tried the Bodhisattva, by producing a hawk (in pursuit of a) dove, when (the Bodhisattva) cut off a piece of his own flesh, and (with it) ransomed the dove. After Buddha had attained to perfect wisdom, and in traveling about with his disciples (arrived at this spot), he informed them that this was the place where he ransomed the dove with a piece of his own flesh. In this way the people of the country became aware of the fact, and on the spot reared a tope, adorned with layers of gold and silver plates."

== Historical Journals ==
James Cordiner, a Chaplain attached to the British Military Garrison in Colombo between 1797 and 1804, described the temple in detail as an extensive complex of intricately painted caverns and temple buildings.

== Temple layout ==
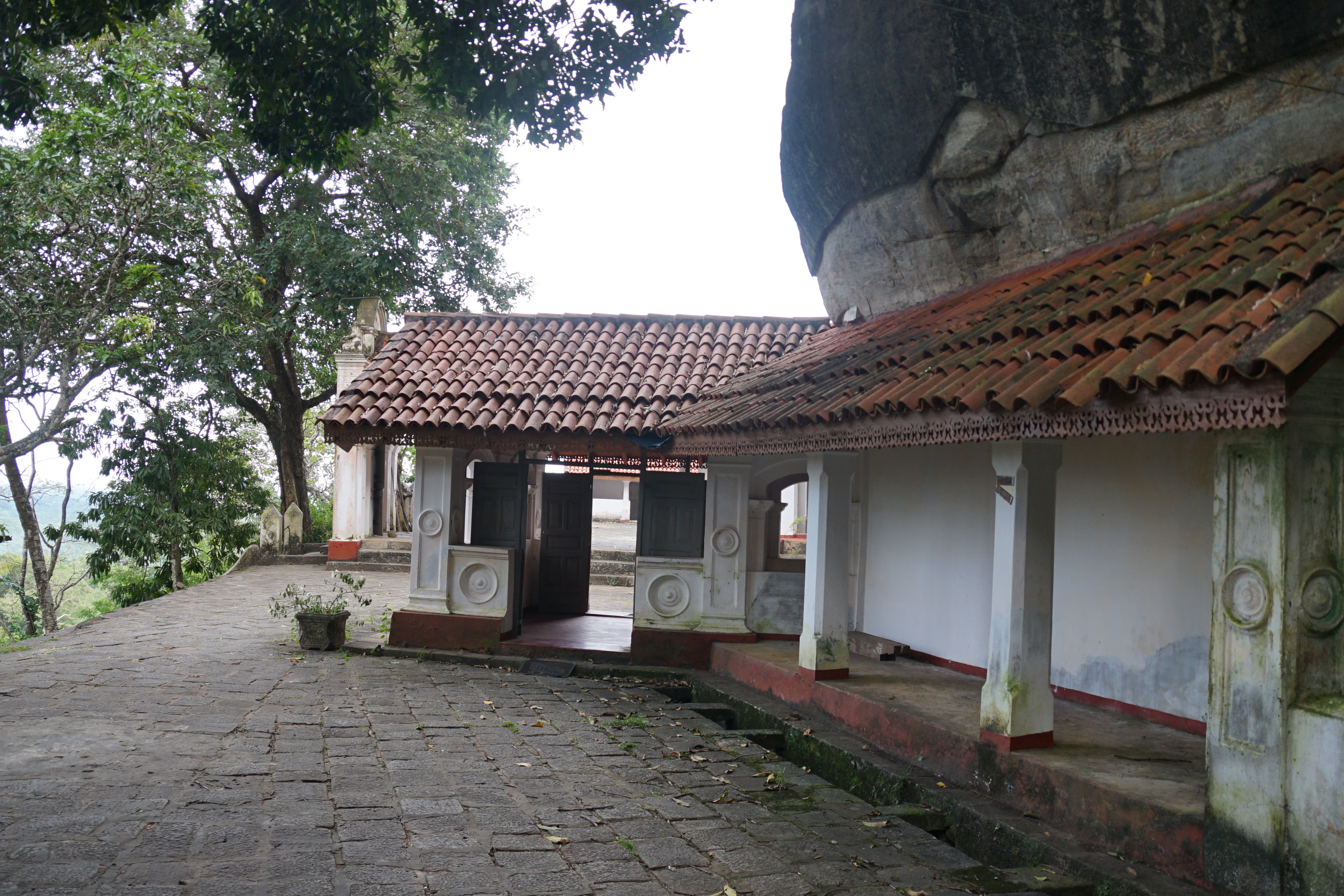
Lower Vihara Compound

The site consists of seven viharas and has been constructed within five compounds known as Siyambalamaluwa, lower vihara compound, Bomaluwa, Rajamaha vihara compound, and upper Vihara compound.

- Siyambalamaluwa, which comprises the museum, lower temple and the rest house.
- Lower Vihara compound consists of the Raja Maha Viharaya, tombs, Seemamalakaya, Monastery and Paduma Rahath Viharaya. Paduma Rahath Vihara contains the largest reclining Buddha image of the Vihara. There is also a small painted pagoda found inside the cave. Additionally an information centre has been established in this terrace.
- Bomaluwa, which consists mainly of the Vesak hall compound, Majjhima Nikaya cave (Bhanaka cave), Viharagal rock inscription (6-7 Century), and Bomaluwa (Bo tree terrace).
- The Raja Maha Vihara compound contains the Piriniwan Manchakaya, Raja Maha Viharaya, Aluth Viharaya, Naga Viharaya, pond, rock inscription (12 Century), lamp post and Diyagoda Etha Viharaya. A rock inscription found in this compound reveals the ancient name of the temple as Muhundgiri Vihara.
- Dethispala Bodhiya, attendant Bodhiya, Garandi Kapolla, Chaitya, bell tower, pond and horizon valley can be seen in upper vihara compound. Dethispala Bodhiya is believed to be one of 32 sapling, brought from Anuradhapura where the original Jaya Sri Maha Bodhi is situated.

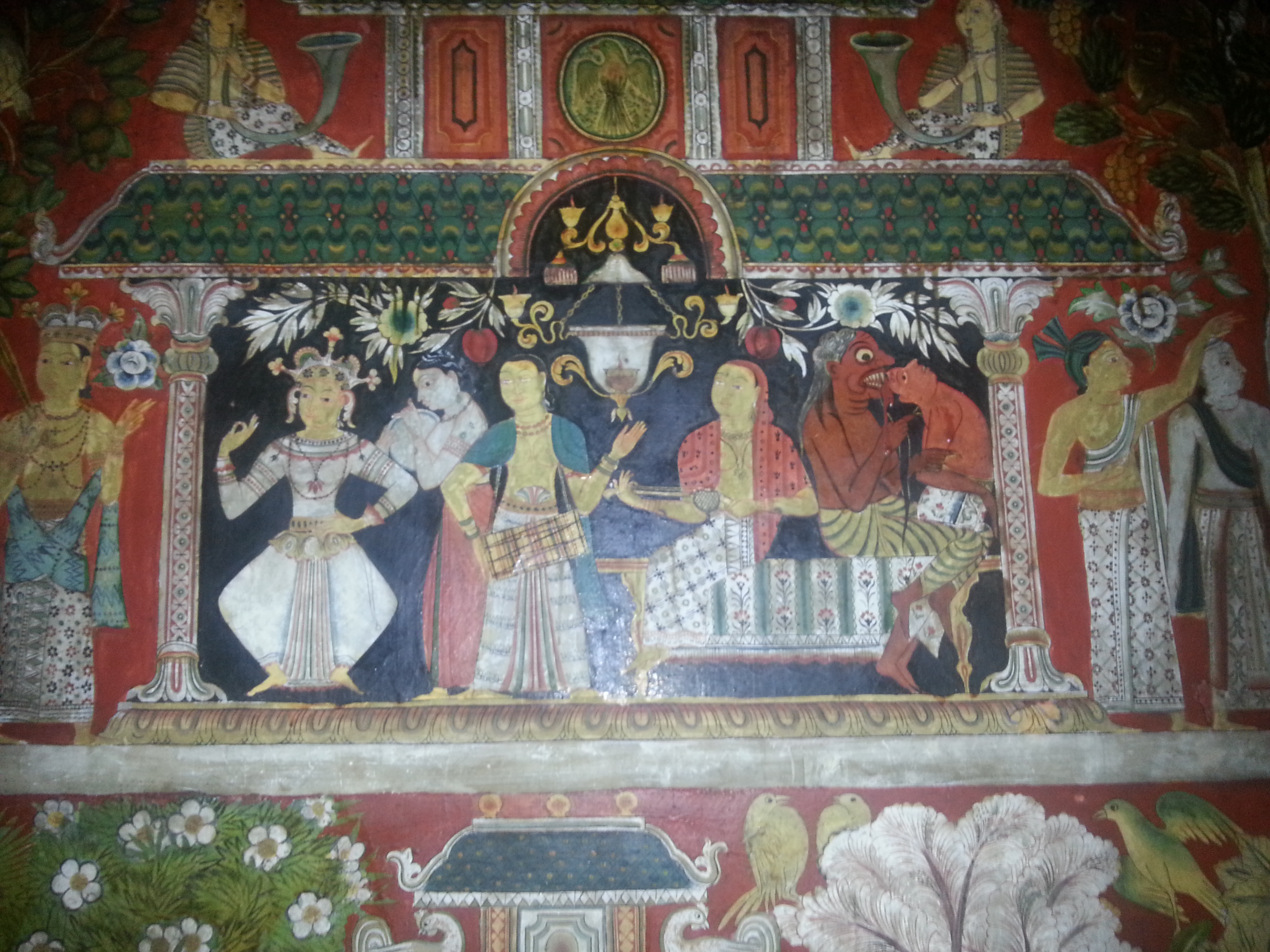
Lower Vihara paintings

== Murals ==
A large collection of paintings and sculptures belonging to the Kandyan Era can be seen in the caves and image houses in the Vihara premises. Most paintings depict the episodes from the life of the Gautama Buddha and Jataka stories, such as Vessantara, Telapatta and Shivi.

== Vihara inscriptions ==
=== Mulkirigala cave inscription ===
Period: 2nd-1st centuries BC, Script: Early Brahmi, Language: Old Sinhala
Text: Majhima banaka Bata Upasonaha lene agata ana(gata)
Content: "The cave of Upasona, a monk of the Majhima Bhanaka (lineage of the Majjhima Nikaya) is given to the Sangha of the four quarters both present and absent"

=== Mulkirigala rock inscription ===
Period: 6th-7th centuries AD, Script: Transitional Brahmi, Language: Old Sinhala
Content: "This vaharala (manumission) inscription states that Hidila of Salihi and Padapagana of Pahapava were freed from compulsory service in the monastery"

=== Mulkirigala rock inscription near the pond ===
Period: 9th-10th centuries AD, Script: Medieval Sinhala, Language: Medieval Sinhala
Text: (1) Muhundu giriya kaha (2)val kiyana ral maha (3) llan keta vu..... (4) massatake (5) tu satara piyageta
Content: "It is mentioned in this inscription that an elderly person name Kahavelkiyana Rala has caused the construction of four stone steps to the pond at Muhundugiri vihara"

== See also ==
- Mulkirigala Museum
