= Sri Subodharama Raja Maha Vihara =

Sri Lankan historic Buddhist temple

- ශ්‍රි සුබෝධාරාම රජ මහා විහාරය
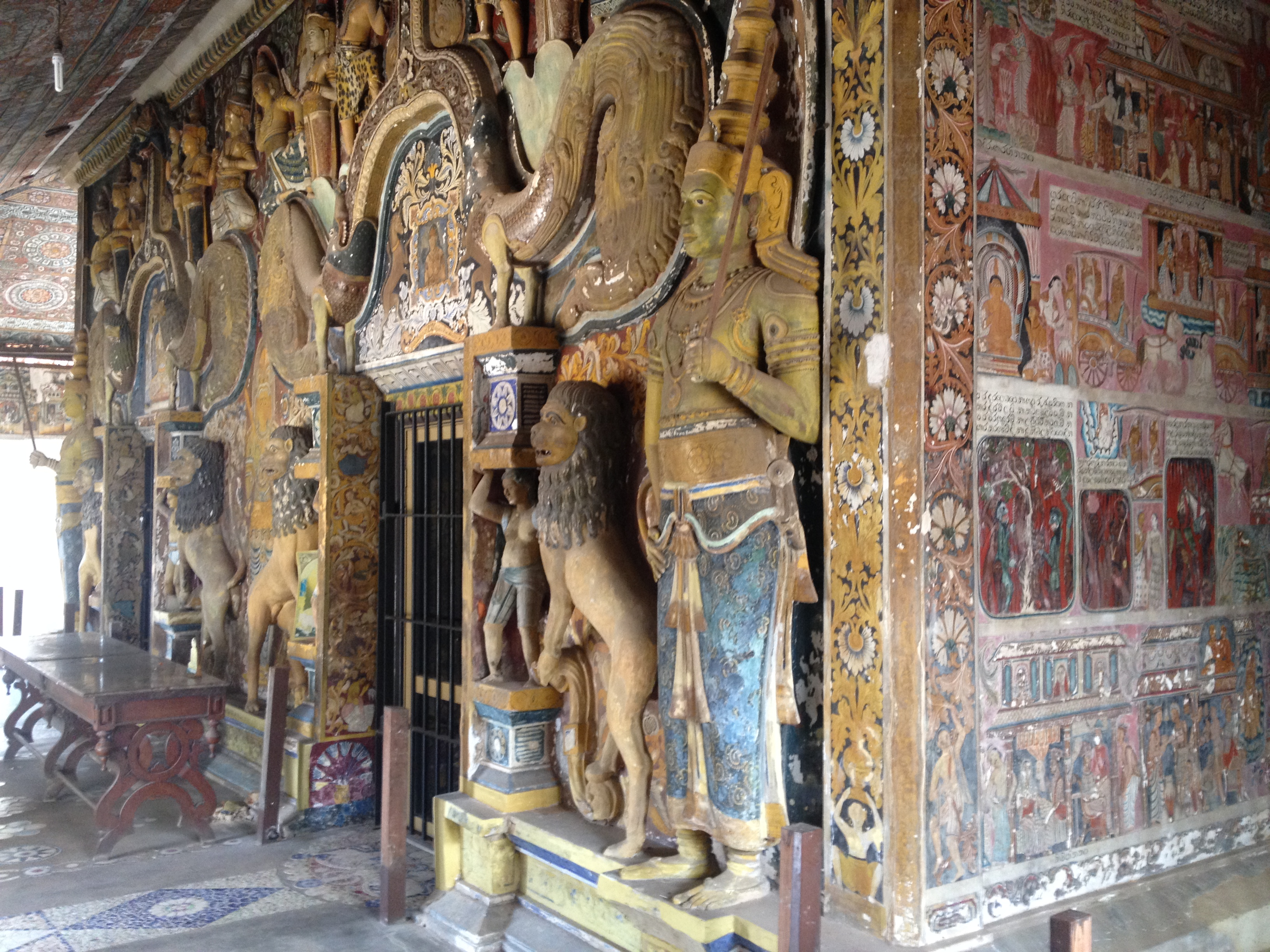
- The front wall of the inner chamber

Religion
- Affiliation: Buddhism
- District: Colombo
- Province: Western Province

Location
- Location: Karagampitiya, Sri Lanka
- Interactive map of Sri Subodharama Raja Maha Vihara
- Coordinates: 06°50′56.0″N 79°52′05.9″E

Architecture
- Type: Buddhist Temple

Sri Subodharama Raja Maha Vihara (Also known as Karagampitiya Vihara) is a historic Buddhist temple situated at Dehiwala in the Western province, Sri Lanka. The temple is located at the Dehiwala junction on the Colombo-Galle main road, about 9 miles south of Colombo city. The temple has been formally recognised by the Government as an archaeological site in Sri Lanka. The designation was declared on 23 February 2007 under the government Gazette number 1486.

== History ==
=== Background ===
In the early periods, Karagampitiya area was part of the Kingdom of Kotte and came under the region of Medimala (Nedimale). During the reign of king Parakramabahu VI (1412–1467) the Medimala village was gifted to the Natha Devalaya at Pepiliyana. The western area of the Medimala village was allocated to the fishing community and known as Karagampitiya as they supply fish to the royal palace. In order to protect the fishermen from calamities and to safeguard the kingdom from foreign invasions, the king constructed a new Devalaya at the collum of a Na tree (Mesua ferrea) on a hillock at Karagampitiya.

During the Portuguese presence in the island, the Devalaya at Karagampitiya was destroyed and its stone pillars were used to erect the St. Anthony's church at Mount-Lavinia. A Dutch church and an Ambalama were built in the Karagampitiya area under Dutch rule . It is said that the first incumbent of the Karagampitiya Vihara, Ven. Hikkaduwe Indrajothi thera had lived at that Ambalama. In 1881, the old stone pillars from the destroyed Devalaya were again returned to the Karagampitiya temple when the Methodist church of Mt. Lavinia was built by British rulers of that time.

=== The temple ===
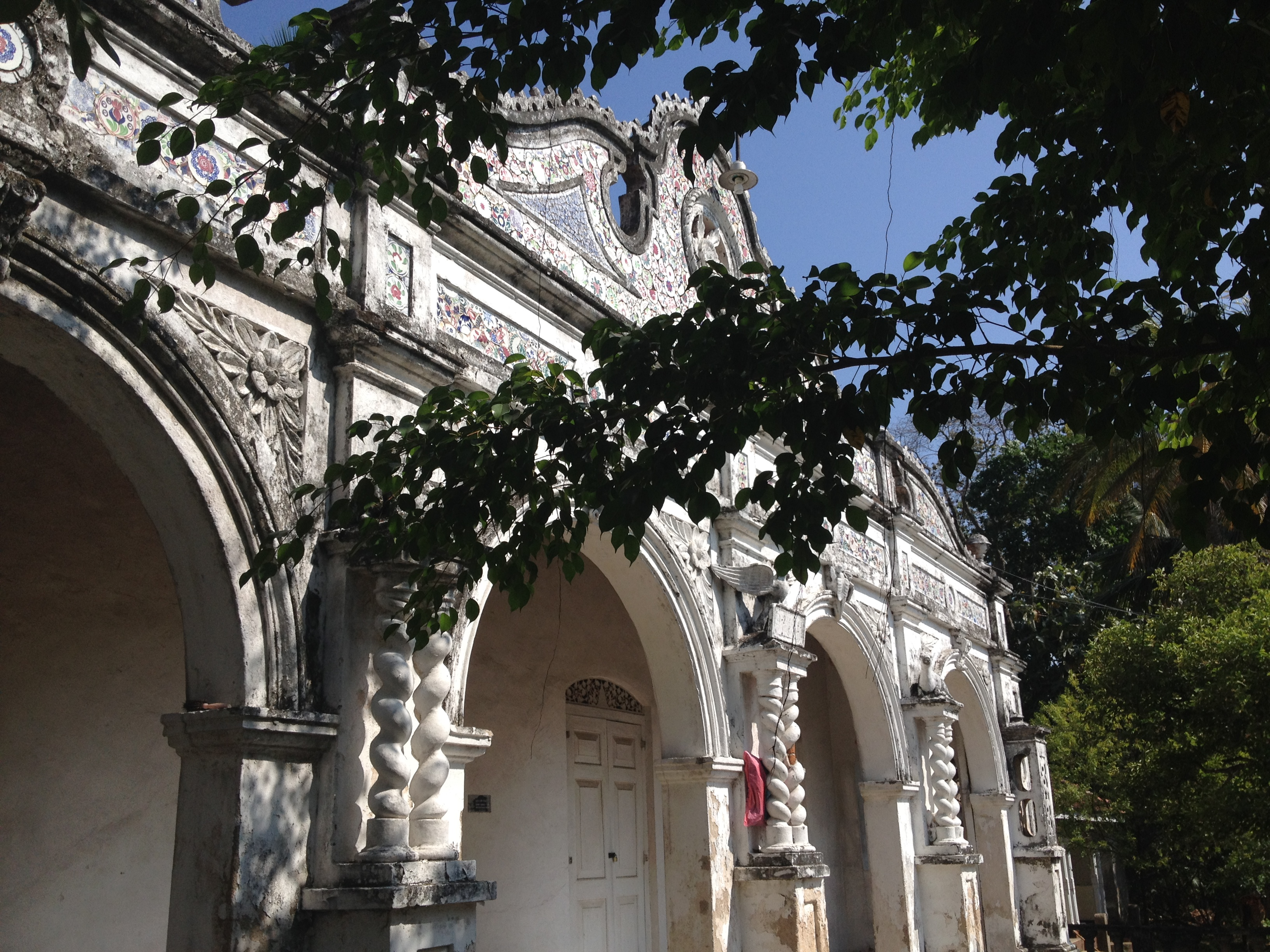
Sath-Sathi-Geya was built in 1895

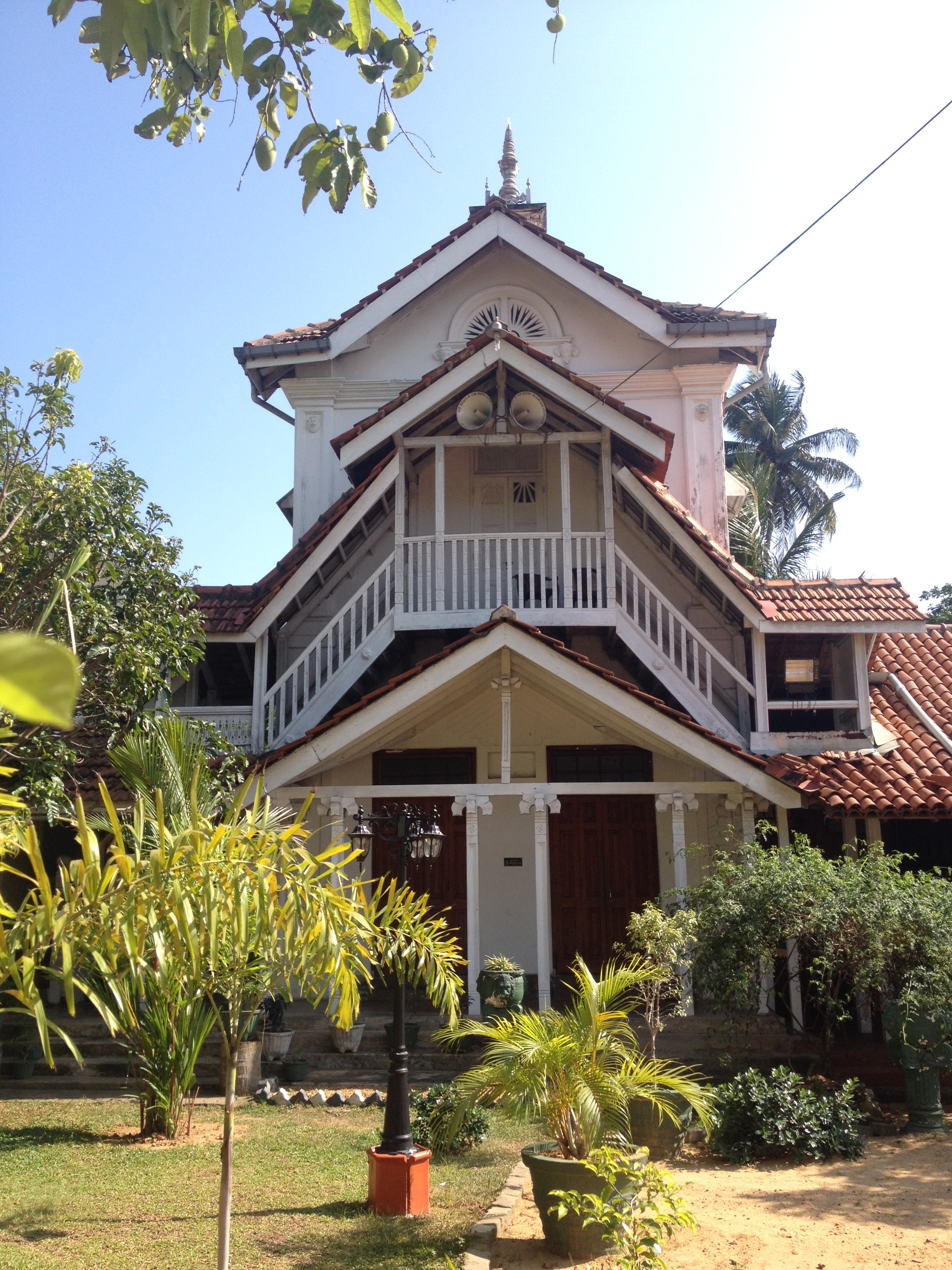
The dwelling house of the Vihara

The Buddha statues of the Vihara are dated back to the year 1780 and believed to be the creation of the same artist of Kelaniya Raja Maha Vihara. In 1795 during the reign of king Rajadhi Rajasingha the construction of the Vihara work was completed and the work of the Stupa (Cetiya) was finished in 1796. As soon as the completion of the Vihara work, a plant from the Jaya Sri Maha Bodhi at Anuradhapura has been implanted in the premises. The preaching hall and the Sath-Sathi-Geya (A shrine room depicting the first seven week of Buddha) at the Vihara have been completed in the year 1895. The monastery of Subodharama at the Karagampitiya is believed to be established in the 1820s.

Recent records about the Subodhara temple has been made in The Book of Ceylon written by Henry William Cave (1909) and in A New Model of the Universe by P D Ouspensky (1914).

== Temple layout ==
The layout of the Vihara consists of several sand terraces. The upper terrace is assigned for the Stupa and the Sath-Sath-Geya and the small chamber of Sri Pada (Foot print of Buddha) are located south to it. The image house is a rectangular building located at the center of the middle terrace and faces to south. To the west of the image house is the lower terrace where the Bodhi tree has been planted. The bell tower, Dhammasala (Preaching hall) and pilgrims' rest are also spread out on the lower terrace while the Awasa geya (Dwelling house of monks) is positioned on the south side, further away from them.

== Murals ==
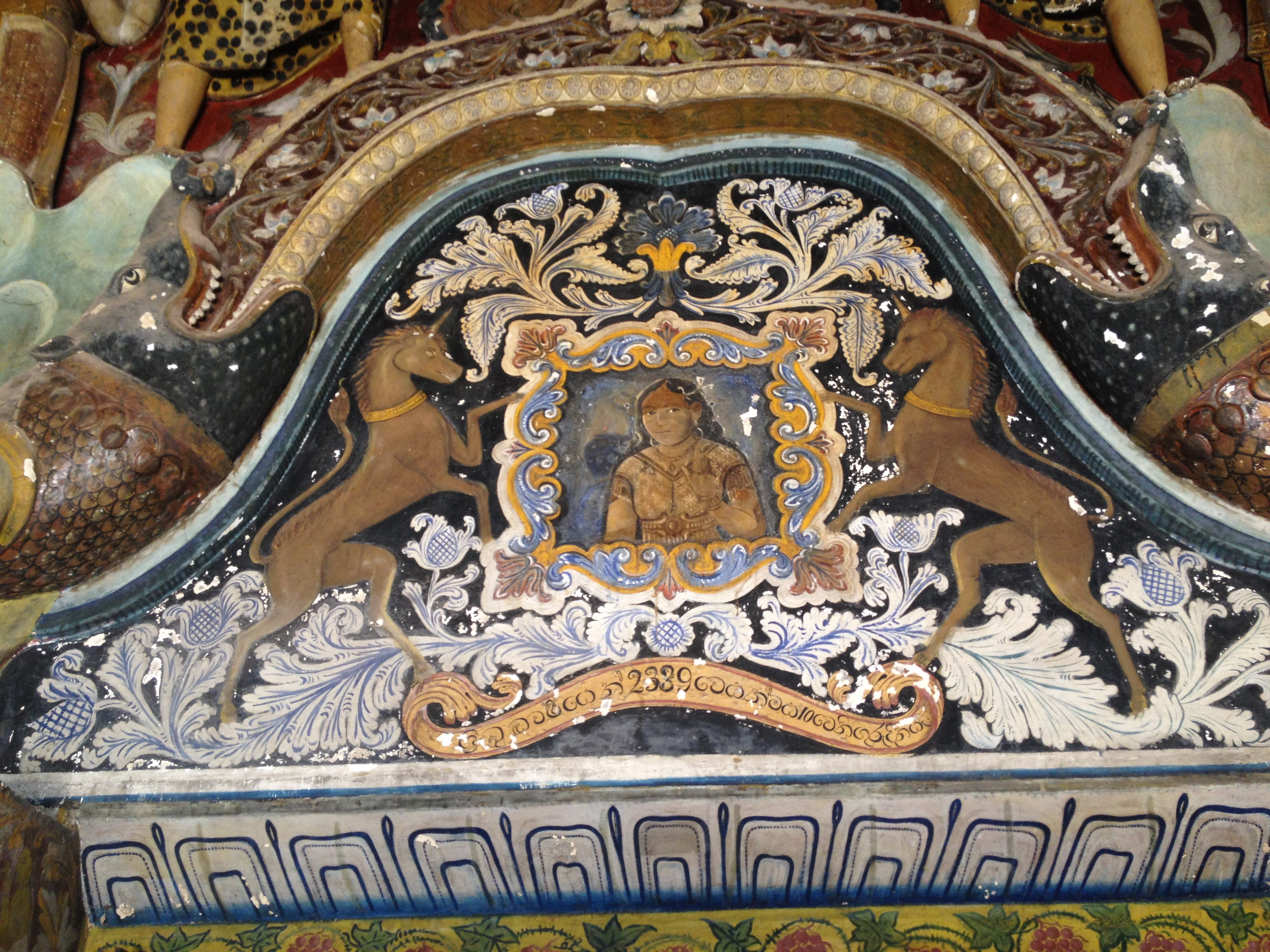
A portrait of Queen Victoria over the inner entrance door of the image house

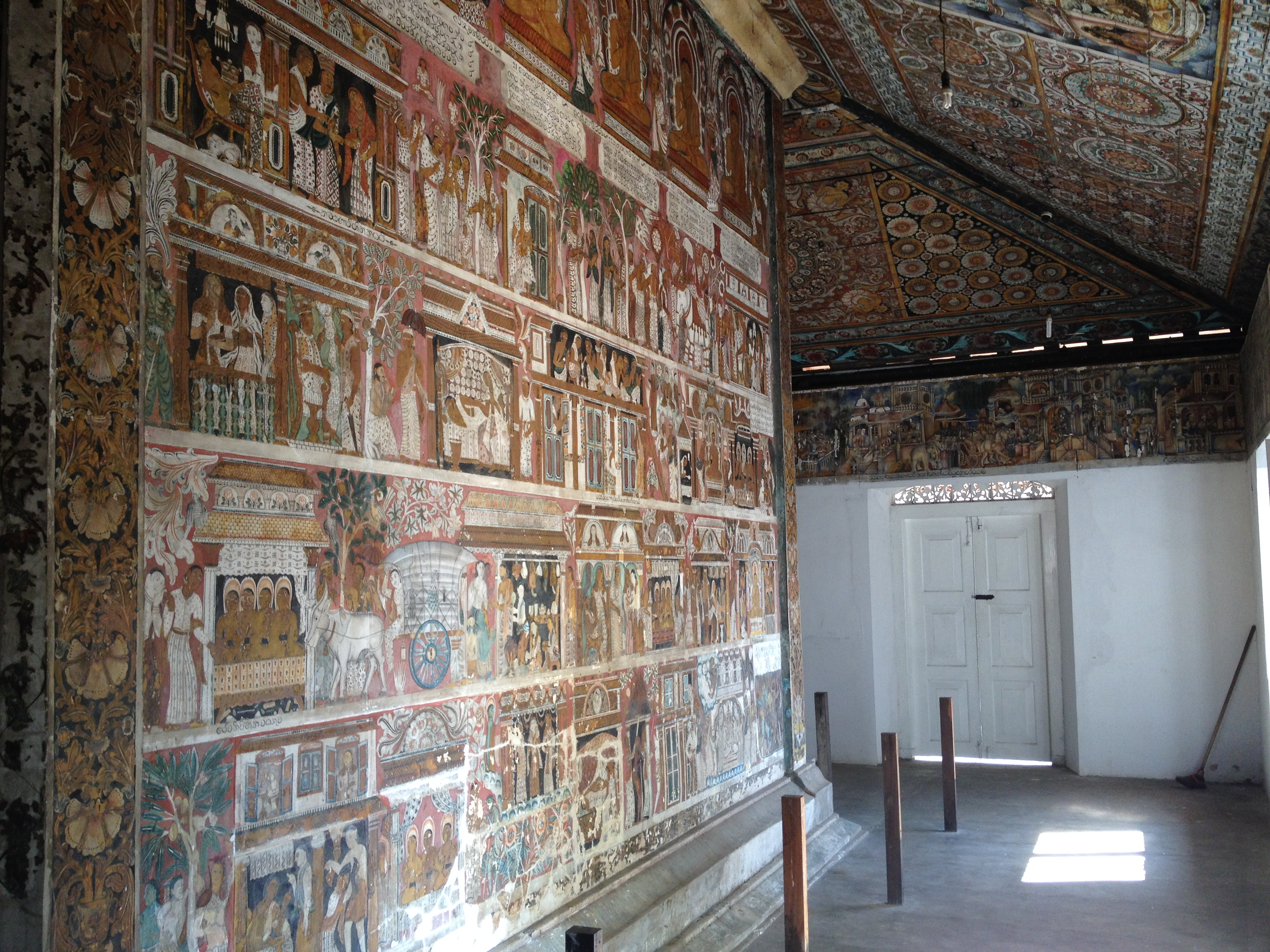
Murals of the inner walls of the ambulatory, ceiling and the outer wall

A large amount of paintings belonging to the Kandyan era adorn interior walls of many buildings in the Vihara complex. The earliest and also the main publication of these painting series are preserved on the three inner walls of the ambulatory of the image house.

The image house consists of an inner chamber (shrine room) surrounded by an outer shelter. The inner chamber opens towards the south direction and has two entrances, framed with sculpted Makara Thorana (Dragons arches). A portrait of the Queen Victoria has been painted over the right side entrance door in a framed portrait, accompanied by two unicorns. Also some Delftware fragments and VOC coins have been used to decorate the door surface as well as the floor of the image house.

The outer walls of the inner chamber contain a large number of narrative paintings arranged in five horizontal bands of nearly 26 inches in height. These bands are adorned with various drawings related to the Buddhism. The upper most horizontal bands of the three walls are illustrated with proclamation of the twenty four Buddhas of the past while the lower band decorated with floral scrolls and lotus petal motif. The middle bands of the walls display the episodes from the life of the Gautama Buddha and Jataka stories. (Khadirangara Jataka, Nimi Jataka, Mahajanaka Jataka, Manicora Jataka and Katthahari Jataka). All the paintings show the features of conventional style of the hill-country (18th century) and the realistic style of the low-country (19th century).

The ceiling and the upper part of the outer walls of the ambulatory of the image house have also been covered with paintings done in 1897. The upper part of the outer wall represent the story of Maha Ummagga Jataka while Buddhist heavens are depicted on the ceiling panels.

== See also ==
- Kotte Raja Maha Vihara
