= Mulkirigala Museum =

Mulkirigala Archaeological Museum
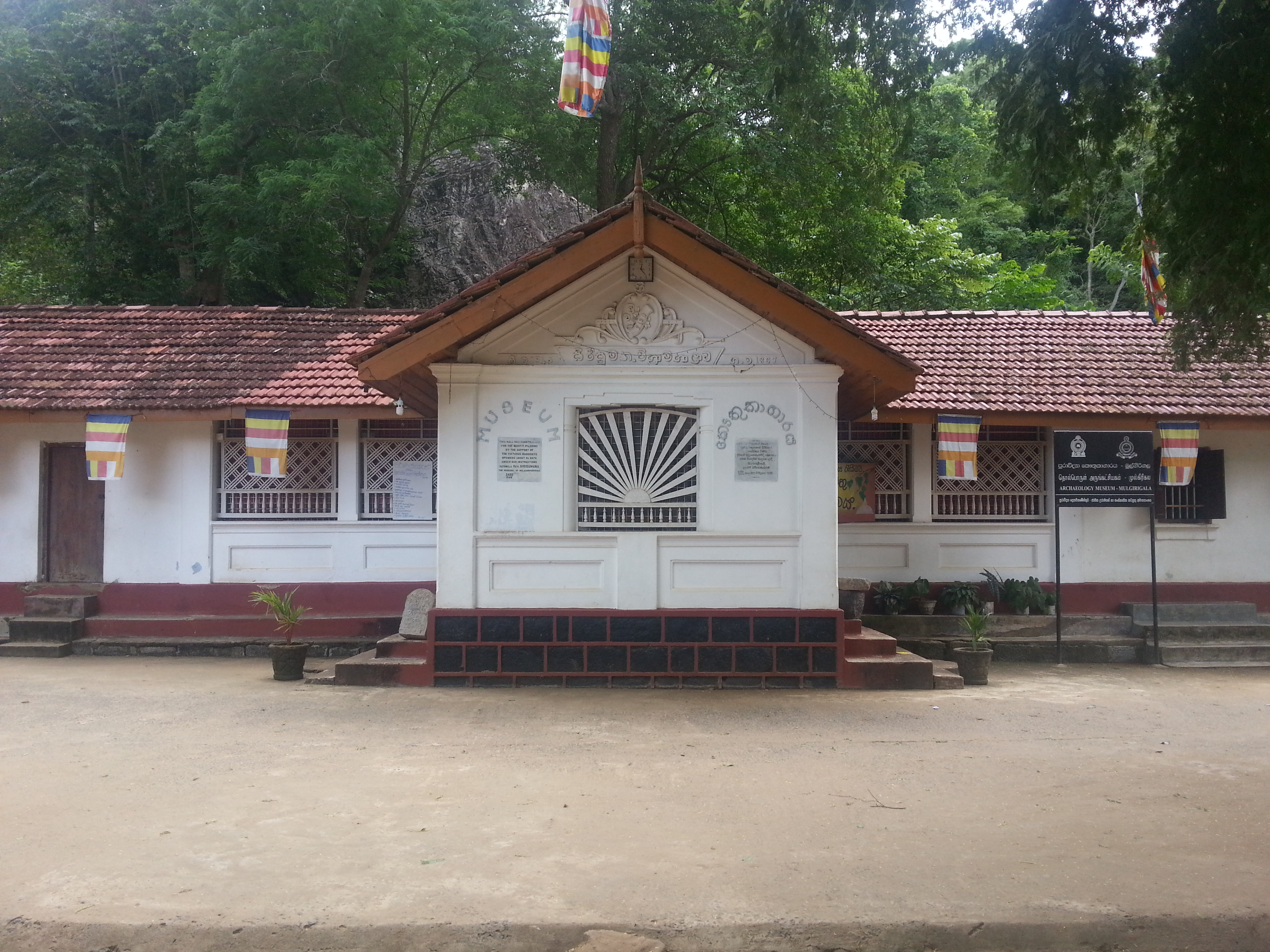
- Archaeological Museum, Mulkirigala
- Location: Mulkirigala, Sri Lanka
- Coordinates: 6°07′22.97″N 80°44′10.95″E
- Type: Archaeological
- Website: http://www.archaeology.gov.lk

Mulgirigala Archaeological Museum is a site museum located at Mulkirigala, Sri Lanka. It was maintained by Department of Archaeology of Sri Lanka.

The museum is used to exhibit archaeological objects found in Mulkirigala and surrounding area. It contains collection of rare stuff such as Palm-leaf manuscripts, tools, old reports and paintings.

== See also ==
- List of museums in Sri Lanka
