= RSCC =

RSCC may refer to:

- Rare Species Conservation Centre, Sandwich, Kent
- Roane State Community College, Tennessee
- Royal Selangor Country Club, Kuala Lumpur
- Russian Satellite Communications Company
