= National Zoological Gardens of Sri Lanka =

National Zoological Garden of Sri Lanka (Dehiwala)
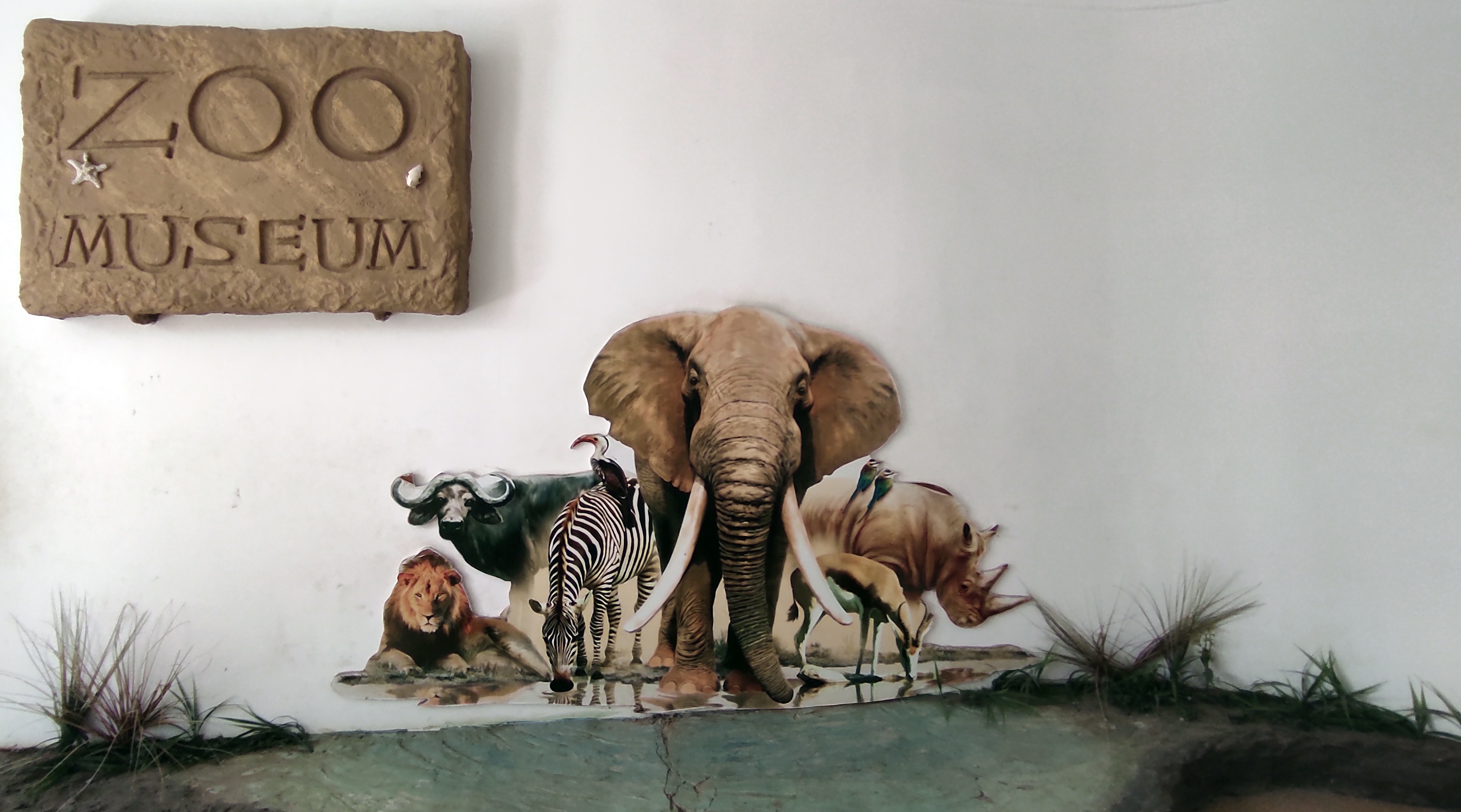
- Dehiwala Zoo Museum
- Interactive map of National Zoological Garden of Sri Lanka (Dehiwala)
- 6°51′24.5″N 79°52′22.4″E
- Date opened: 1936
- Location: Dehiwala, Colombo
- Land area: 10.1 ha / 0.10 km^{2}
- No. of animals: 3000 (2005)
- No. of species: 310 (2013)
- Annual visitors: ~1.5 million (2008)
- Memberships: World Association of Zoos and Aquariums (WAZA)
- Major exhibits: Mammals, reptiles, aquatic animals, birds
- Website: Official website

National Zoological Gardens of Sri Lanka (also called Dehiwala Zoo or Colombo Zoo) is a zoological garden in Dehiwala, Sri Lanka, founded in 1936. It is home to various birds, mammals, reptiles, fish and amphibians. The zoo not only exhibits animals from Sri Lanka, but also from across Asia and other parts of the globe.

As of 2005, the zoo has 3,000 animals and 350 species. The annual revenue is LKR 40 million.

The Dehiwala Zoo exchanges its residents with other zoological gardens for breeding purposes. In June 2021, a lion named Thor which had been living in the zoo since 2012 reportedly tested positive for COVID-19.

== History of dehiwala zoo ==
Sri Lanka has a history of collecting and keeping wild animals as pets by both Sri Lankan kings as well as by European colonisers. What is known today as the National Zoological Gardens of Sri Lanka was founded by John Hagenbeck in the late 1920s. During John Hagenbeck's ownership of the zoos the facility was used as a collection centre by his colleague Heinz Randow who collected numerous native and exotic species from across Asia, for Hagenbeck's zoo; Tierpark Hagenbeck. Randow collected numerous native species such as tufted grey langur, purple-faced langur, toque macaque, sloth bear, Sri Lankan leopard, Asian water monitor, axis deer and sambar deer and other Asian species like; Asiatic black bear, Bengal tiger, Malayan tiger, Malayan tapir, rhesus macaque, bonnet macaque, a variety of pythons, fish and invertebrates.

Before World War I, the Dehiwala Zoo was also involved in Ethnographic Expositions (human zoo exhibits) and functioned as holding quarters for live human exhibits collected from around the region.

The zoo was closed at the beginning of World War II in 1939 because the company's owner was German. After the liquidation of Zoological Garden Company in 1936, the government acquired much of the collection and added it to the Dehiwala Zoo (Zoological Garden of Ceylon) collection. Although Dehiwala Zoo officially began operating in 1939, an impressive animal collection already existed as part of the Hagenback company's holding area where the public could visit.

Major Aubrey Neil Weinman, OBE was the first Director of the Dehiwala Zoo. During his tenure, various programs were developed, such as introducing more native and foreign species, launching educational and conservation programs, and improving the facilities and infrastructure. Aubrey Neil Weinman went on to help design the National Zoo of Malaysia.

After Major Aubrey Neil Weinman's retirement Lyn de Alwis, took over as the zoo Director. Lyn de Alwis played a key role in the development of the zoo. During his tenure the zoo was considered one of the best zoos in the world. This fame led him to be contracted to help design both the Singapore Zoo and Night Safari, Singapore. Lyn de Alwis was able to acquire several rare species for the zoo like; Western gorilla, clouded leopard, red panda, Kodiak bear, North China leopard, Chinese mountain cat, Oriental stork and Chinese giant salamander.

By 1969, half of the collection consisted of native species including virtually all of the mammals represented. In 1973, the zoo had 158 mammal species, 259 bird species, 56 reptile species and seven fish species. However, not much was reported on the size of zoo collection until the 1980s.

== Zoo ==
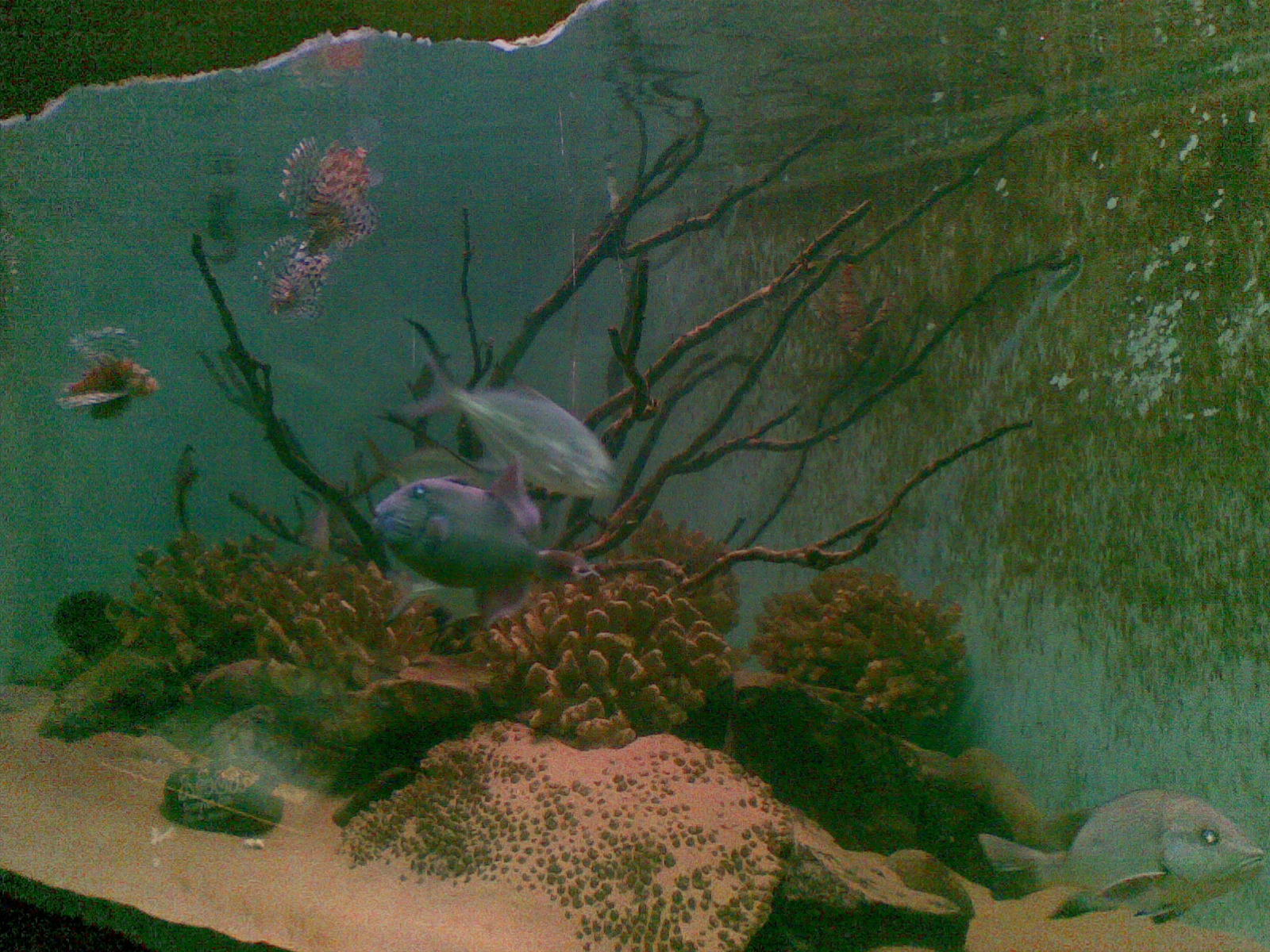
Red lionfish (Pterois volitans) in Min Madura

Dehiwala Zoological Garden is one of the oldest zoological gardens in Asia. It has a substantial collection of worldwide animals, being open year-round and accessible via public transportation. The diversity of the zoo is shown its in aquarium, two walk-through aviaries, reptile house, butterfly garden and many enclosures of varying sizes.

The zoological garden has a small but picturesque butterfly garden which is decorated with small shrubs, trees, creepers and small streams. The internal temperature and humidity of the house is controlled by artificially created mist. The butterfly garden exhibits 30 species of butterflies in all stages of their life cycles for educational purposes.

Animals in Dehiwala Zoo
Category	Species	Number
Mammals	100	450
Birds	110	1000-1500
Fish	65	1000
Reptiles	34	250
Amphibians	3	20
Butterflies	30	100
Marine invertebrates	10	25

== Landscape ==
The zoo has dense tree coverage and well-landscaped gardens. To provide more natural habitats some lawns of the Zoo have been converted into small forest patches which are rich in rare plants. Valuable medicinal plants are prominent among the trees in these patches.

The zoo consists of shaded pathways with arched cemented bridges for crossing animal enclosures although other equally attractive alternatives exist.

== Museum ==
The museum section displays animal remains such as skeletons, footprints, eggs, excrements and specimen as well as preserved mammals and birds.

== Animal shows ==
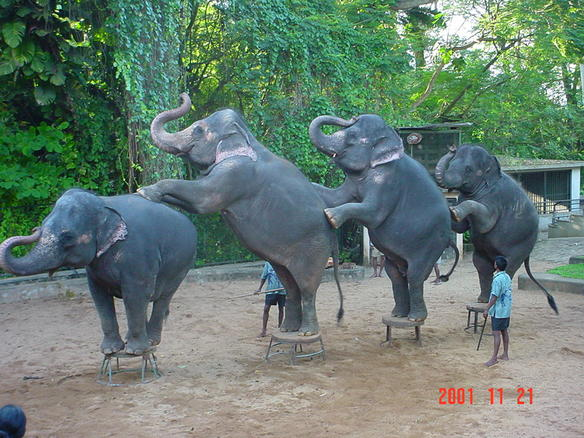
The elephant (Elephas maximus maximus) performances in Dehiwala zoo.

Elephant performances

The elephant performances are held at the elephant arena. Pachyderms perform antics such as standing on their heads, wiggling their backs to music, hopping on one foot and standing up on their hind legs.

Educational programme on chimps

One of the main attractions of the Dehiwala Zoo is the baby chimpanzee Sanju. He was hand raised and now his show is conducted as an educational programme about the chimpanzee's behaviours.

Sea lion performances

The sea lions' performances are displayed daily at the sea lions' pool. Two California sea lions are fed by their keepers. Unfortunately, this sea lion was housed in a measly enclosure with a makeshift bathtub in which to swim when not performing.

== Animals ==
Jaguar (Panthera onca) in the old big-cat grottos at Dehiwala Zoo, Sri Lanka.

The zoo consists of diverse indigenous species as well as foreign wildlife including mammals, reptiles, birds and fish, destined for a horrible and torturous time spent. Every year the zoo exchanges some of its animals with other zoos around the world to enlarge the diversity of its animals and introduce new species of animals as well.

Dehiwala Zoo always trying to expand its animal collection by introducing new species. In 2008, a three-month-old seal was brought to Sri Lanka from the Krefeld Zoo in Germany.

A green anaconda (Eunectes murinus) which was brought to Sri Lanka along with a male of her species, gave birth to 23 baby anacondas in the Dehiwala Zoo in 2008, and 20 of them survived. This was a very rare occasion of giving birth while in captivity, especially in a relatively unfamiliar territory.

The ongoing animal breeding program is helpful for increasing the population of some animal species in the zoo, and it also important for conservation of endangered species.

The zoo currently houses many different species of mammals including Sri Lankan elephant, lion, jaguar, tiger, sloth bear, brown bear, rusty-spotted cat, Sumatran orangutan, common chimpanzee, lar gibbon, Hamadryas baboon, ring-tailed lemur, silvery lutung, purple-faced leaf monkey, Chapman's zebra, Przewalski's horse, eastern black rhinoceros, reticulated giraffe, hippopotamus, pygmy hippopotamus, Arabian oryx, scimitar-horned oryx and nilgai.

The zoo exhibits their birds in a variety of exhibits including 2 large walk-though aviaries small cages and open air unenclosed ponds. These exhibits house a large array of birds including spot-billed pelican, white-bellied sea eagle, emu, ostrich, southern cassowary, macaws, owls, great argus, scarlet ibis, Victoria crowned pigeon, mute swan, Malabar pied hornbill, Sri Lankan grey hornbill, violet turaco, green turaco, red-crested turaco and southern hill myna.

Many of the zoo's reptiles are housed at the reptile house. The zoo has a large collection of crocodilians often not seen in Asian zoos. Some of the notable reptiles housed at the zoo are as follows; green anaconda, Indian cobra, Russell's viper, carpet python, cat snake, krait, dwarf crocodile, saltwater crocodile, mugger crocodile, Cuban crocodile, gharial, false gharial, Komodo dragon, Malagasy ground boa, Galapagos giant tortoise, African spurred tortoise, Indian star tortoise (Sri Lankan), and green sea turtle.

== New additions to the zoo ==
The table contains the introduction of new animal species which have been imported by the zoo administration. Many of these species were obtained through exchange programmes with foreign zoos from across the globe, while others were outright purchases, made by the zoo.

Year	Species	Amount	Origin
2004	Arabian oryx (Oryx leucoryx)	2	Dvůr Králové Zoo, Czech Republic
2004	Cheetah (Acinonyx jubatus)	1	Tiergarten Schönbrunn, Austria
2004	Bactrian camel (Camelus bactrianus)	1	Moscow Zoo, Russia
2005	Black rhinoceros (Diceros bicornis)	2	Higashiyama Zoo and Botanical Gardens, Japan
2007	Meerkats (Suricata suricatta)	2	Singapore Zoo, Singapore
2007	Rhinoceros iguana (Cyclura cornuta)	2	Singapore Zoo, Singapore
2008	Royal Bengal tiger (Panthera tigris tigris)	3	Xiangjiang Safari Park (Chimelong Safari Park), China
2008	Greater kudu (Tragelaphus strepsiceros)	2	Xiangjiang Safari Park (Chimelong Safari Park), China
2008	Plains zebra (Equus quagga)	2	Xiangjiang Safari Park (Chimelong Safari Park), China
2008	Patagonian mara(Dolichotis patagonum)	2	Prague Zoo, Czech Republic
2008	Ring-tailed coati(Nasua nasua)	2	Prague Zoo, Czech Republic
2008	California sea lion (Zalophus californianus)	1	Krefeld Zoo, Germany
2009	Dwarf crocodile (Osteolaemus tetraspis)	3	Leipzig Zoo, Germany
2009	Pygmy hippopotamus (Choeropsis liberiensis)	1	Singapore Zoo, Singapore
2010	White tiger	2	Xiangjiang Safari Park (Chimelong Safari Park), China
2010	Ring-tailed lemur (Lemur catta)	2	Rare Species Conservation Centre, England
2010	Meerkat (Suricata suricatta)	2	Rare Species Conservation Centre, England
2012	Przewalski's Horse (Equus przewalskii)	2	Prague Zoo, Czech Republic
2012	Hippopotamus (Hippopotamus amphibius)	2	Prague Zoo, Czech Republic
2012	Komodo dragon (Varanus komodoensis)	2	Prague Zoo, Czech Republic
2013	Cotton-top tamarin (Saguinus oedipus)	2	England
2013	Common squirrel monkey (Saimiri sciureus)	2	England
2016	Common squirrel monkey (Saimiri sciureus)	2	Guyana
2017	Mandrill (Mandrillus sphinx)	2	Israel
2017	Pygmy marmoset (Callithrix pygmaea)	4	Israel
2017	Ring-tailed lemur (Lemur catta)	6	Israel
2017	Golden-handed tamarin (Saguinus midas)	2	Israel
2017	Grivet (Chlorocebus aethiops)	6	Israel
2017	Crab-eating macaque (Macaca fascicularis)	9	Israel
2017	South American coati (Nasua nasua)	2	Israel
2019	Jaguar (Panthera onca) (Black Panther)	1	BestZoo, Netherlands
2023	Jaguar (Panthera onca)	1	BestZoo, Netherlands
2023	Capybara (Hydrochoerus hydrochaeris)	4	Green Zoological Garden, India
2023	Ring-tailed lemur (Lemur catta)	6	Green Zoological Garden, India
2023	Reticulated python (Malayopython reticulatus)	2	Green Zoological Garden, India
2023	Red-necked wallaby (Notamacropus rufogriseus)	2	Green Zoological Garden, India
2023	Southern Cassowary (Casuarius casuarius)	3	Thailand
2025	Himalayan brown bear (Ursus arctos isabellinus)	2	Capital Zoo, United Arab Emirates
2025	Spotted hyena (Crocuta crocuta)	4	Capital Zoo, United Arab Emirates
2025	Slender-tailed meerkat (Suricata suricatta)	2	Capital Zoo, United Arab Emirates

== Conservation success ==
The zoo breeds numerous endangered species from across the globe. They have been able to breed; pygmy hippos, common hippopotamus, eastern black rhinoceros, Chapman's zebra, Przewalski's horses, reticulated giraffes, Arabian oryx, scimitar-horned oryx, lar gibbons, Sumatran orangutans, silvery lutung and Bengal tigers.

== Facilities for visitors ==
Elephant rides, pony rides, restaurants, ice cream shop, and a souvenir shop are available facilities for the visitors.

== Gallery ==
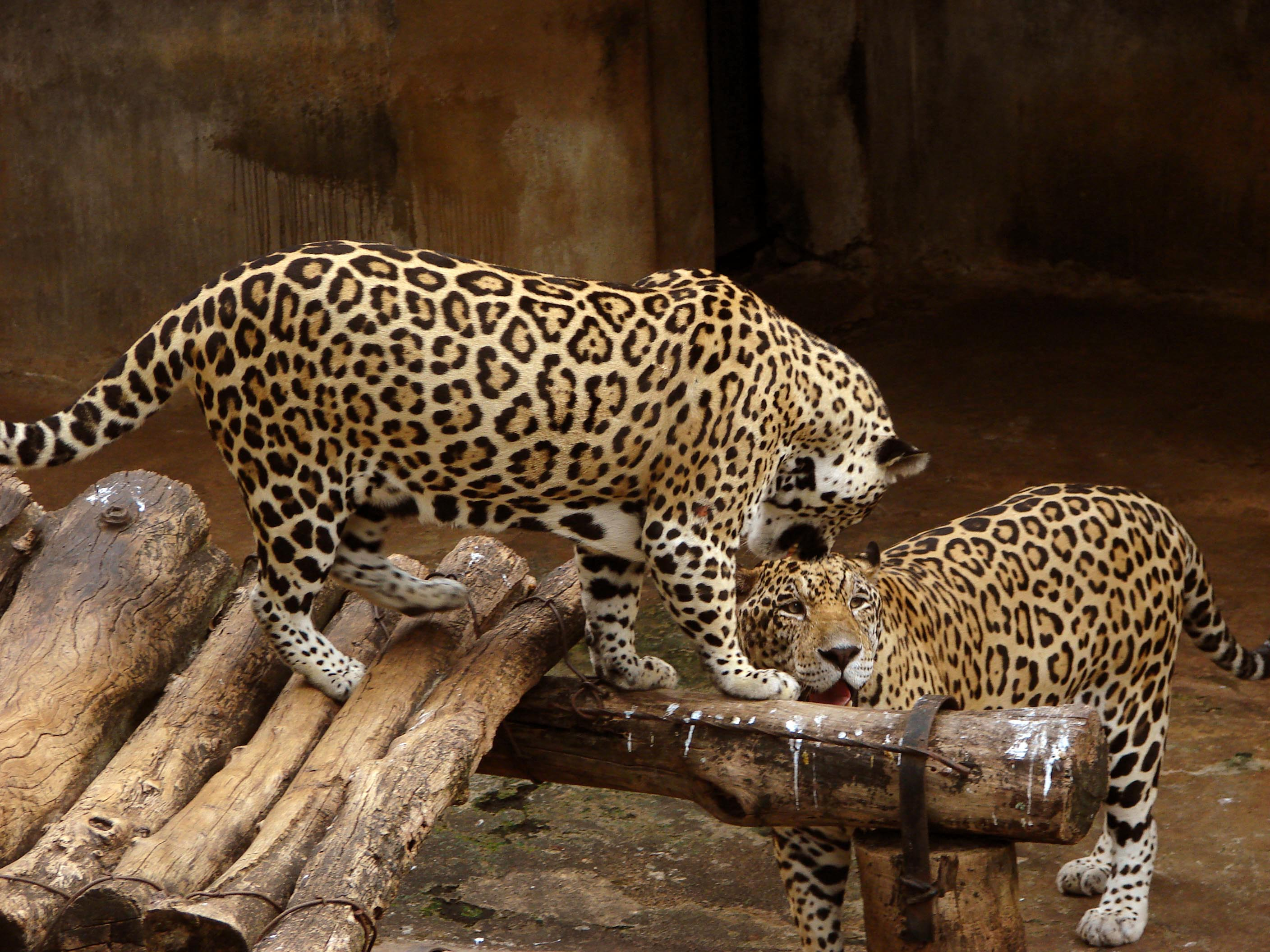
A pair of jaguars in the old big-cat grottos (Panthera onca)

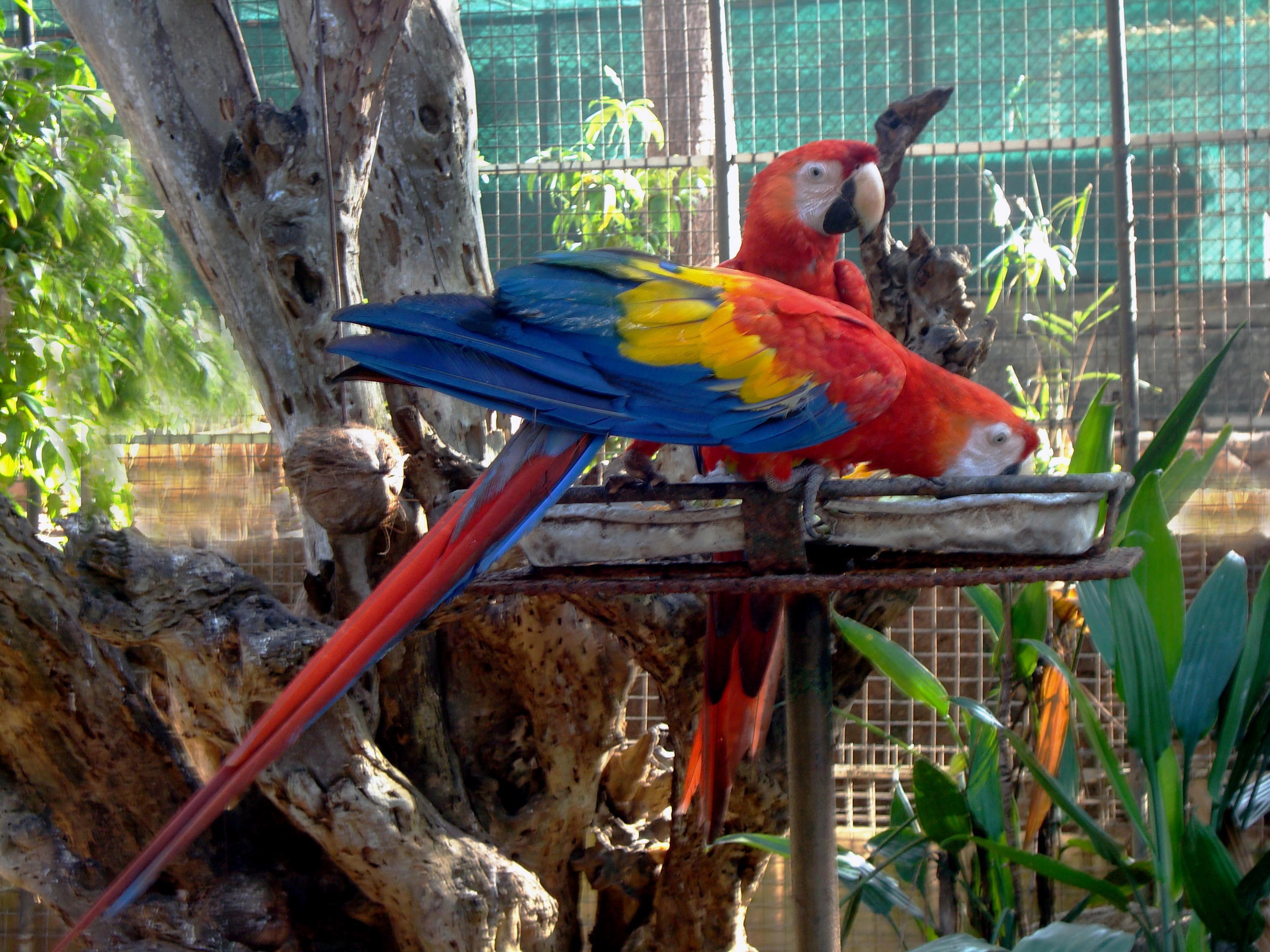
A pair of scarlet macaws (Ara macao)

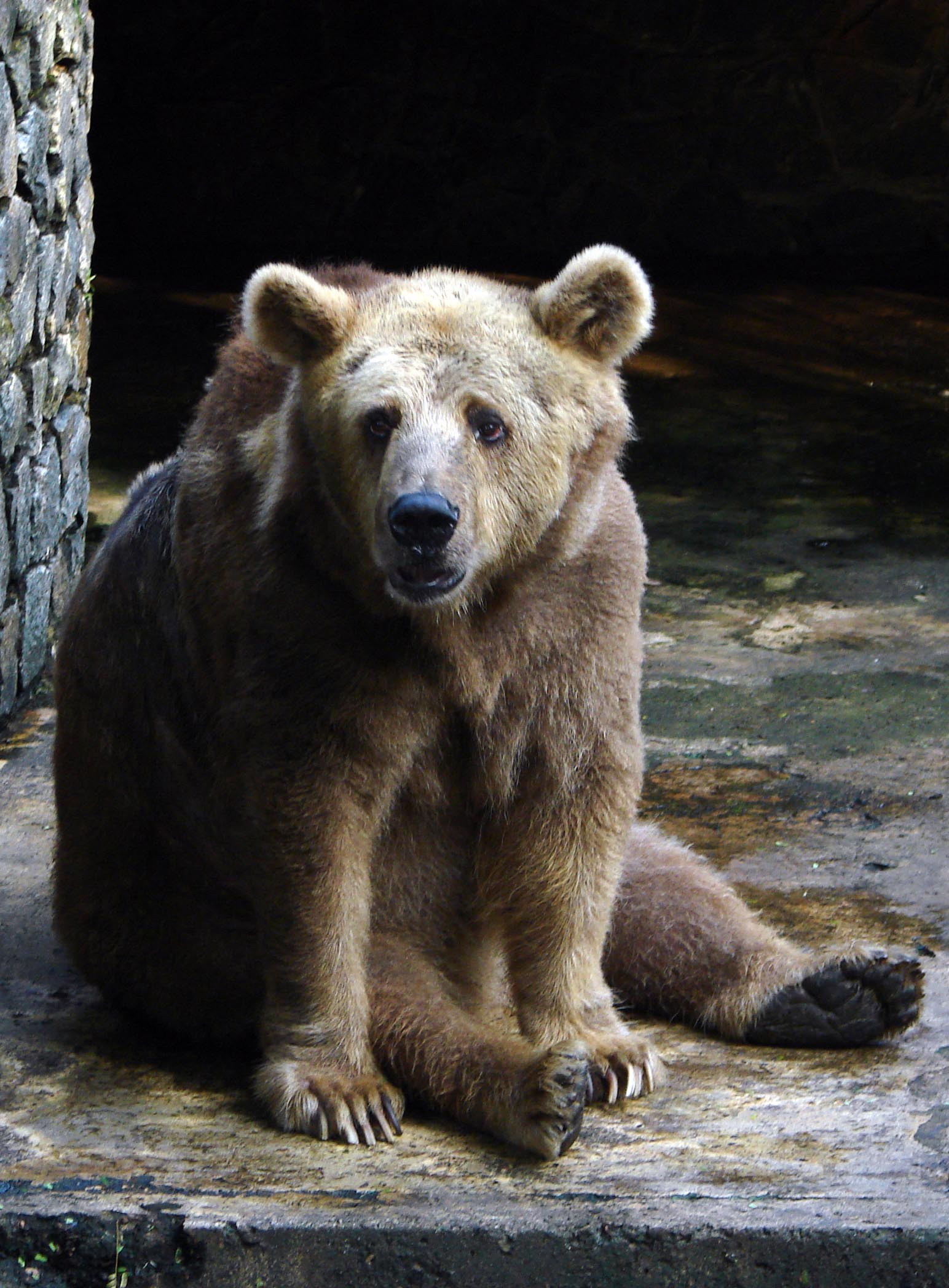
Brown bear (Ursus arctos)

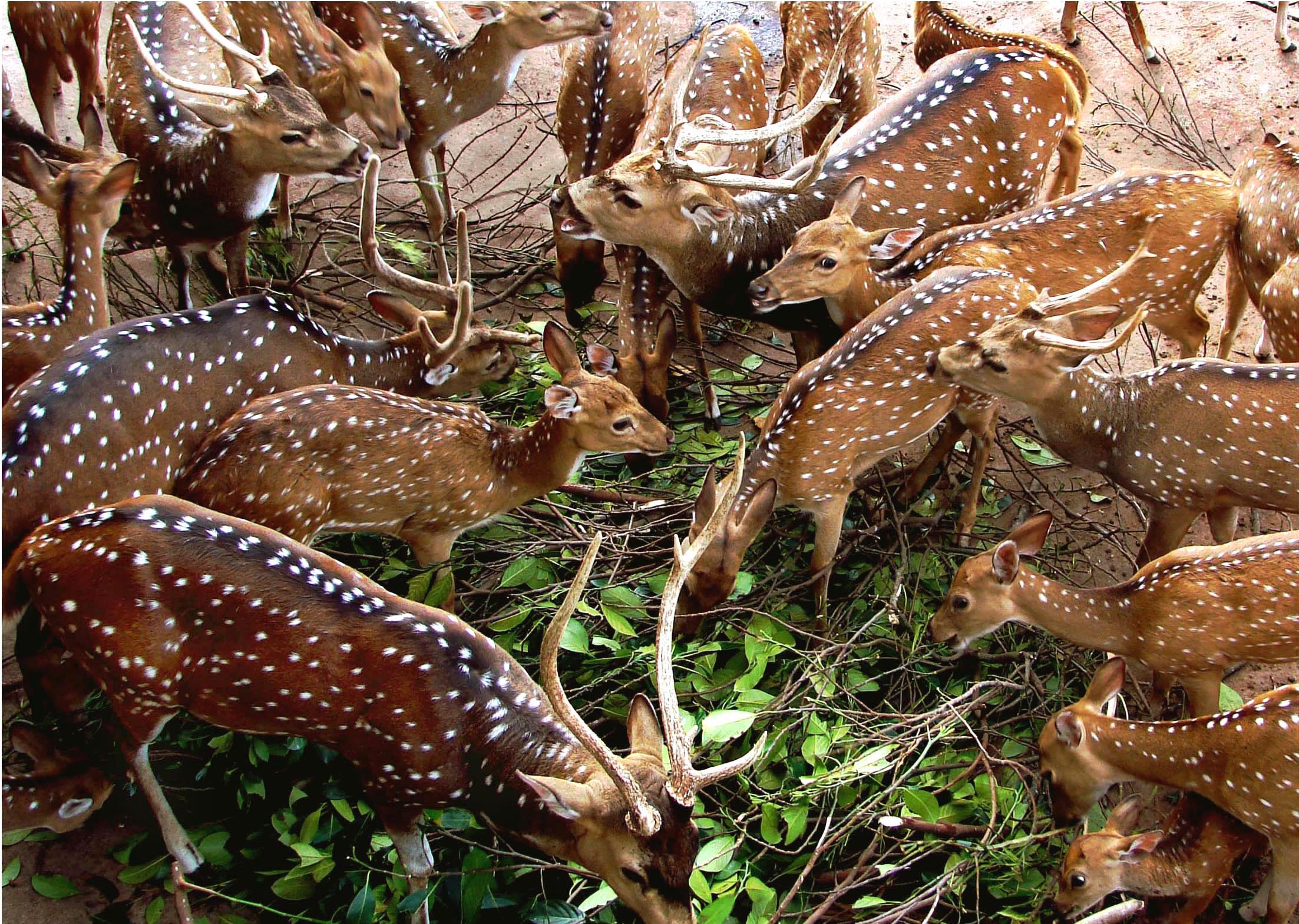
Sri Lankan axis deer (Axis axis ceylonensis)

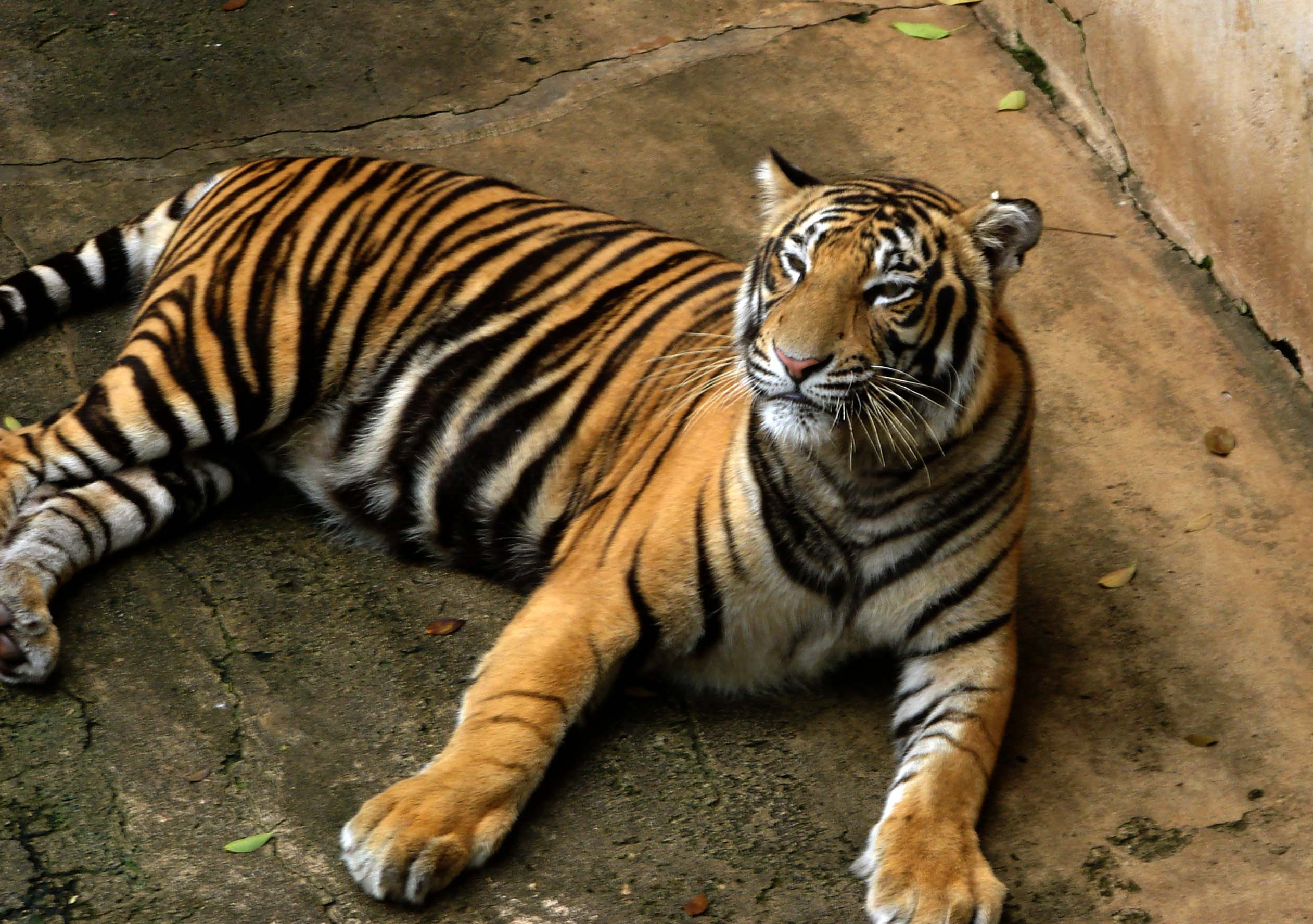
Bengal tiger in the old big-cat grottos (Panthera tigris tigris)

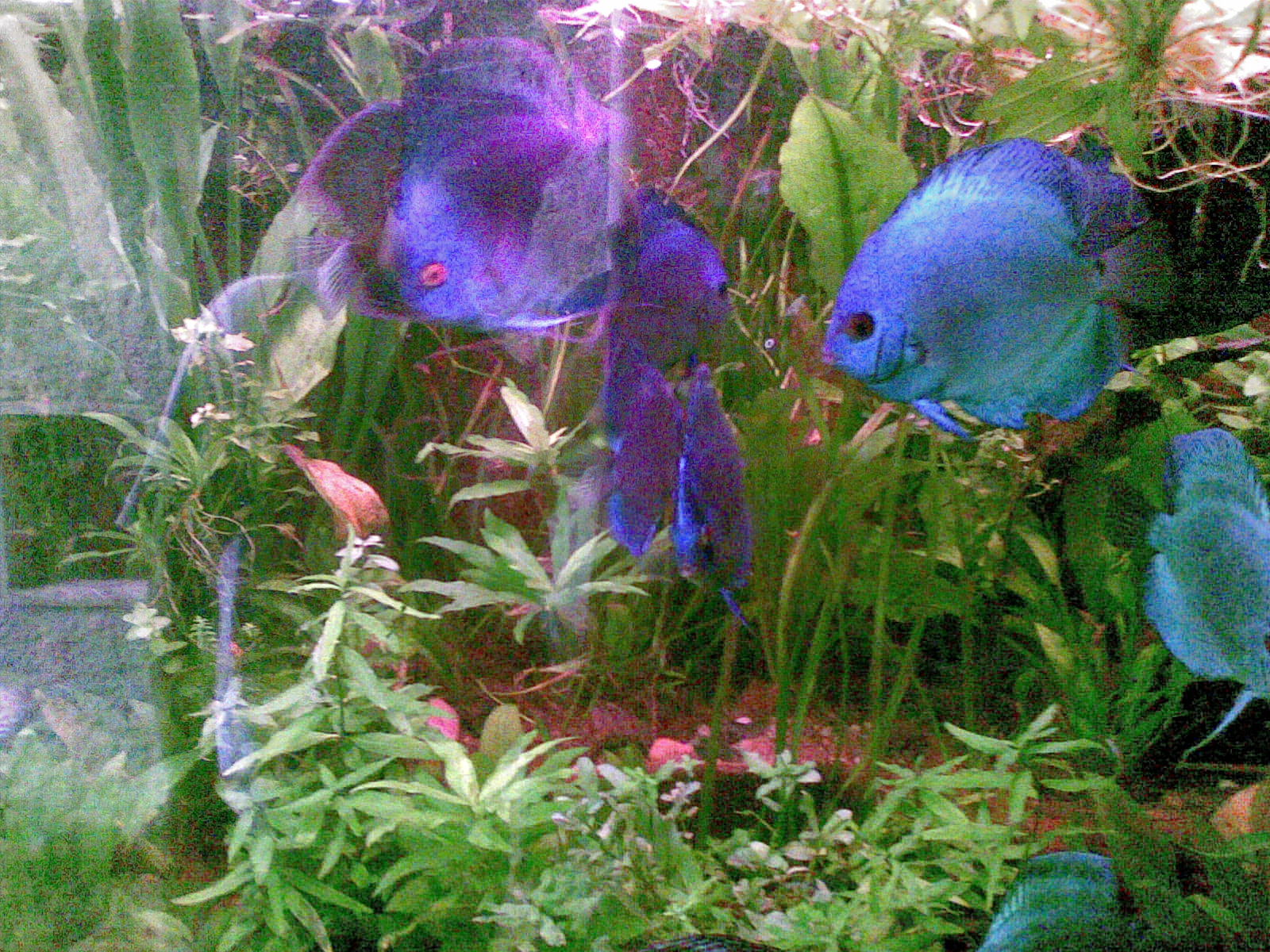
Discus (Symphysodon spp.) fish

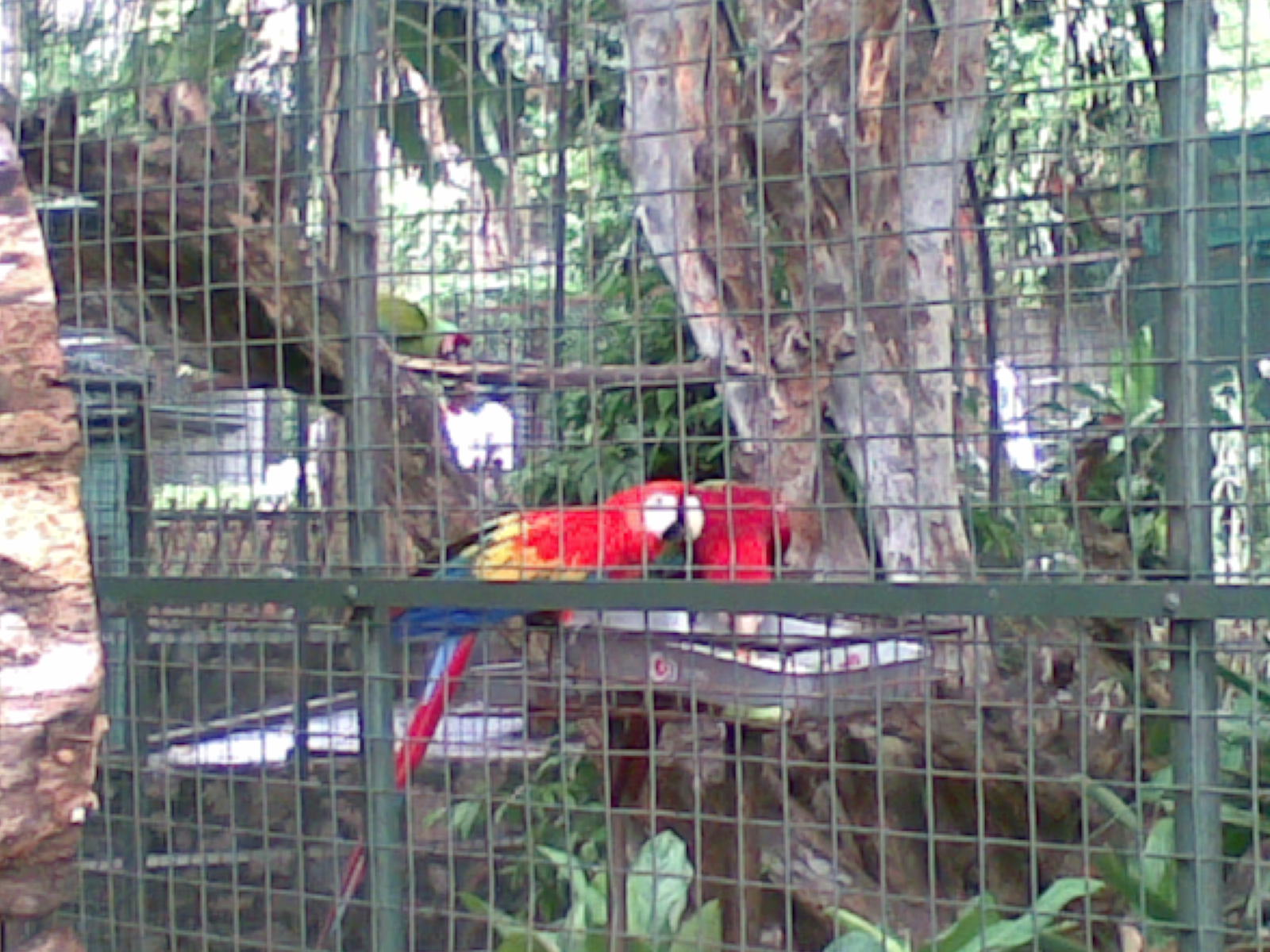
Scarlet macaws (Ara macao) in the mixed species macaw aviary, shared with Green-winged Macaws, Military Macaws and Blue and Gold Macaws.

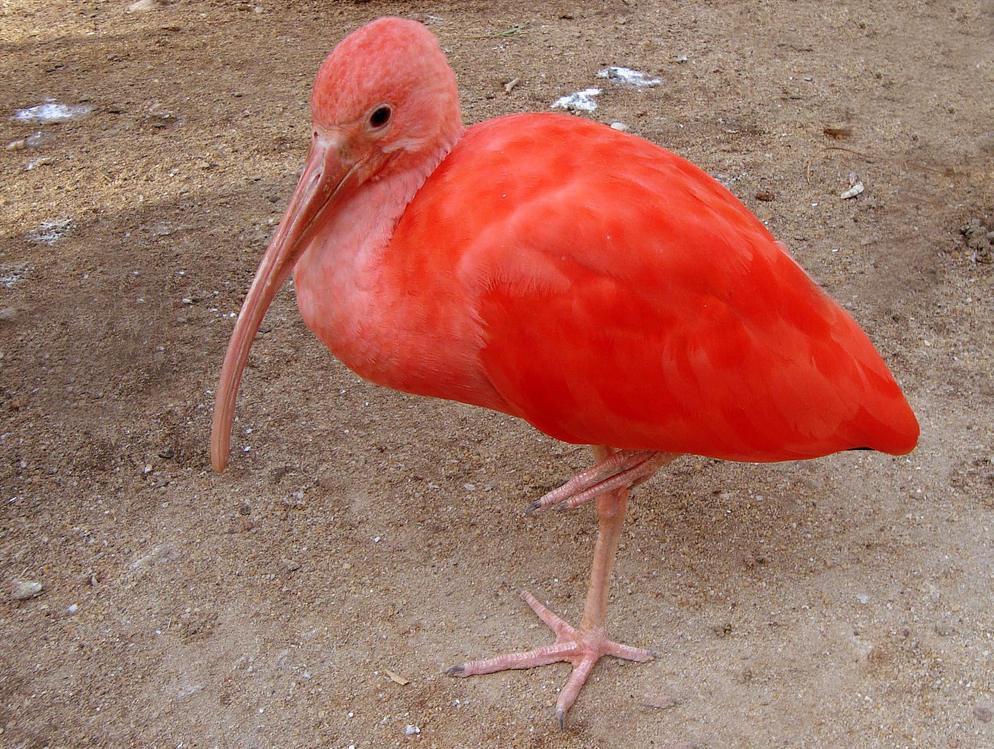
Scarlet ibis (Eudocimus ruber)

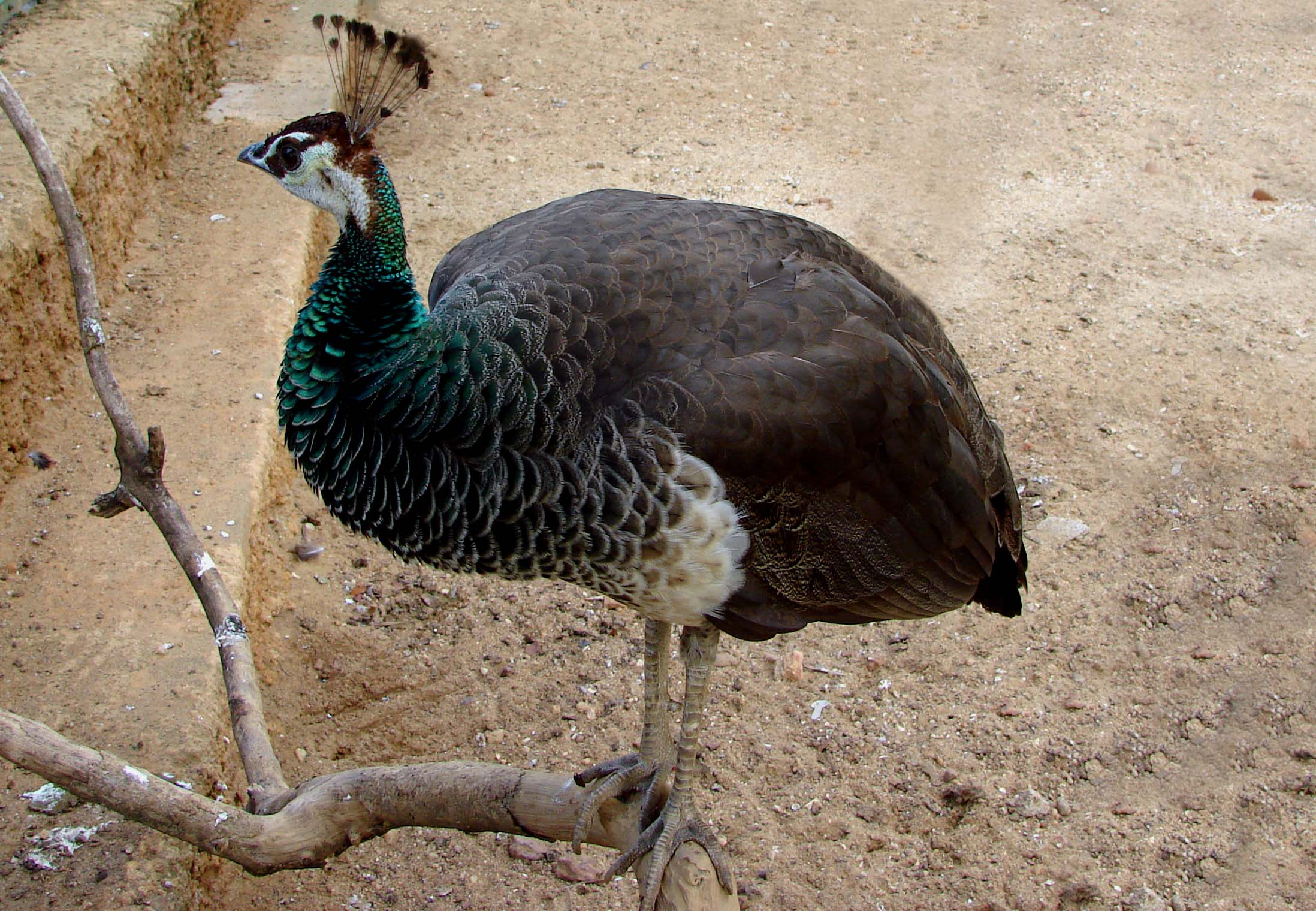
Female Indian Peafowl (Pavo cristatus)

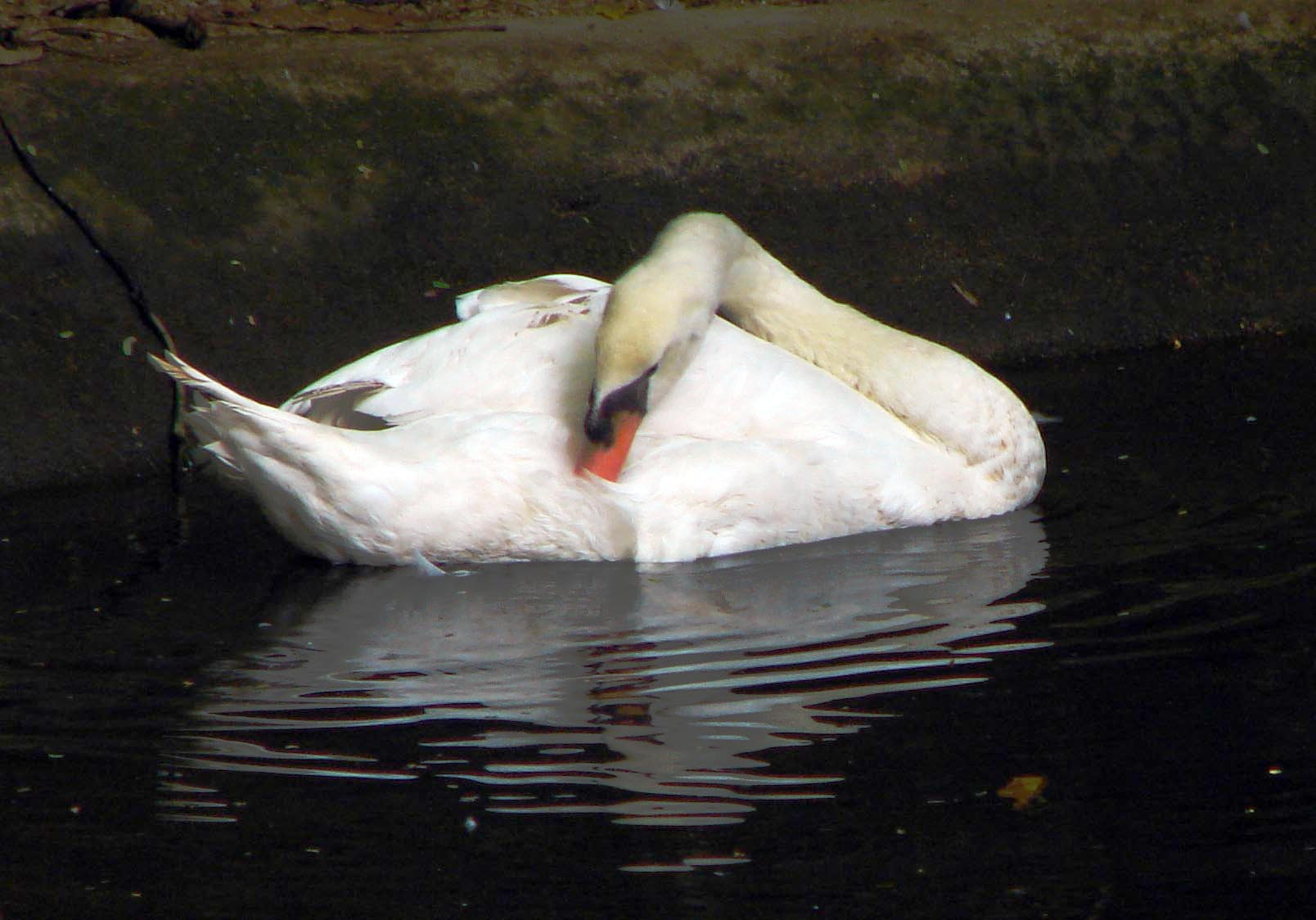
Mute Swan in the large waterfowl pond (Cygnus olor)

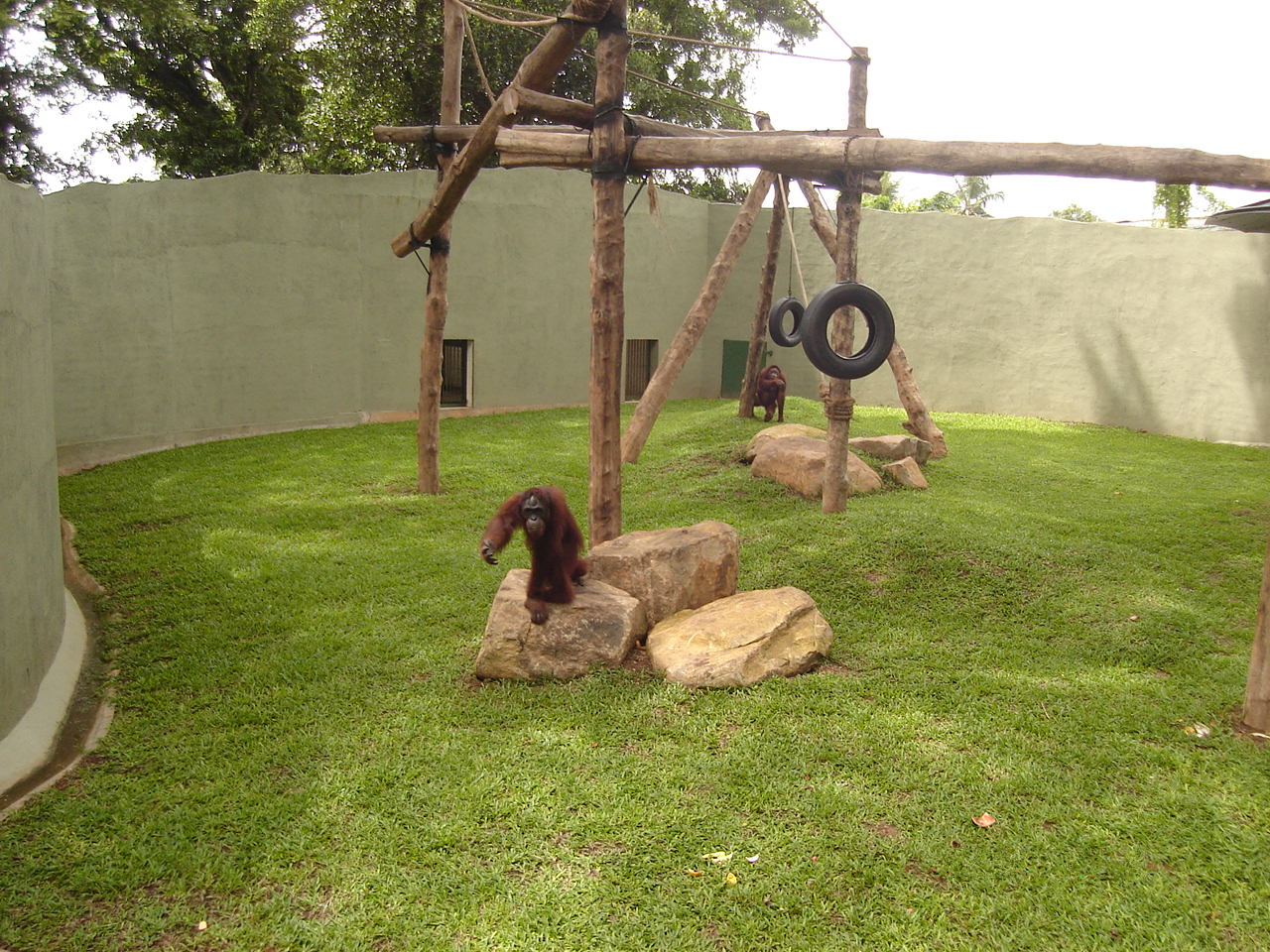
Sumatran Orangutan (Pongo abelii) enclosure .

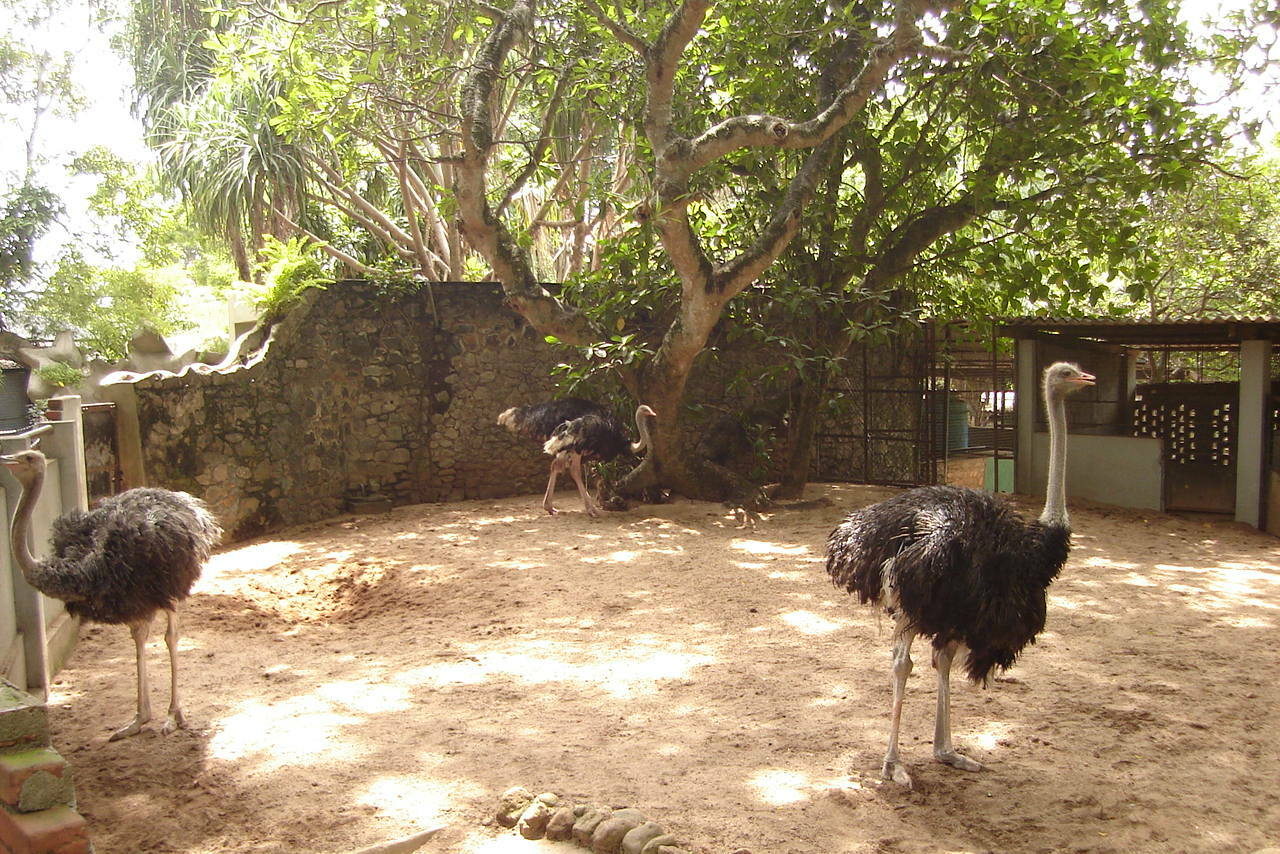
Common Ostrich

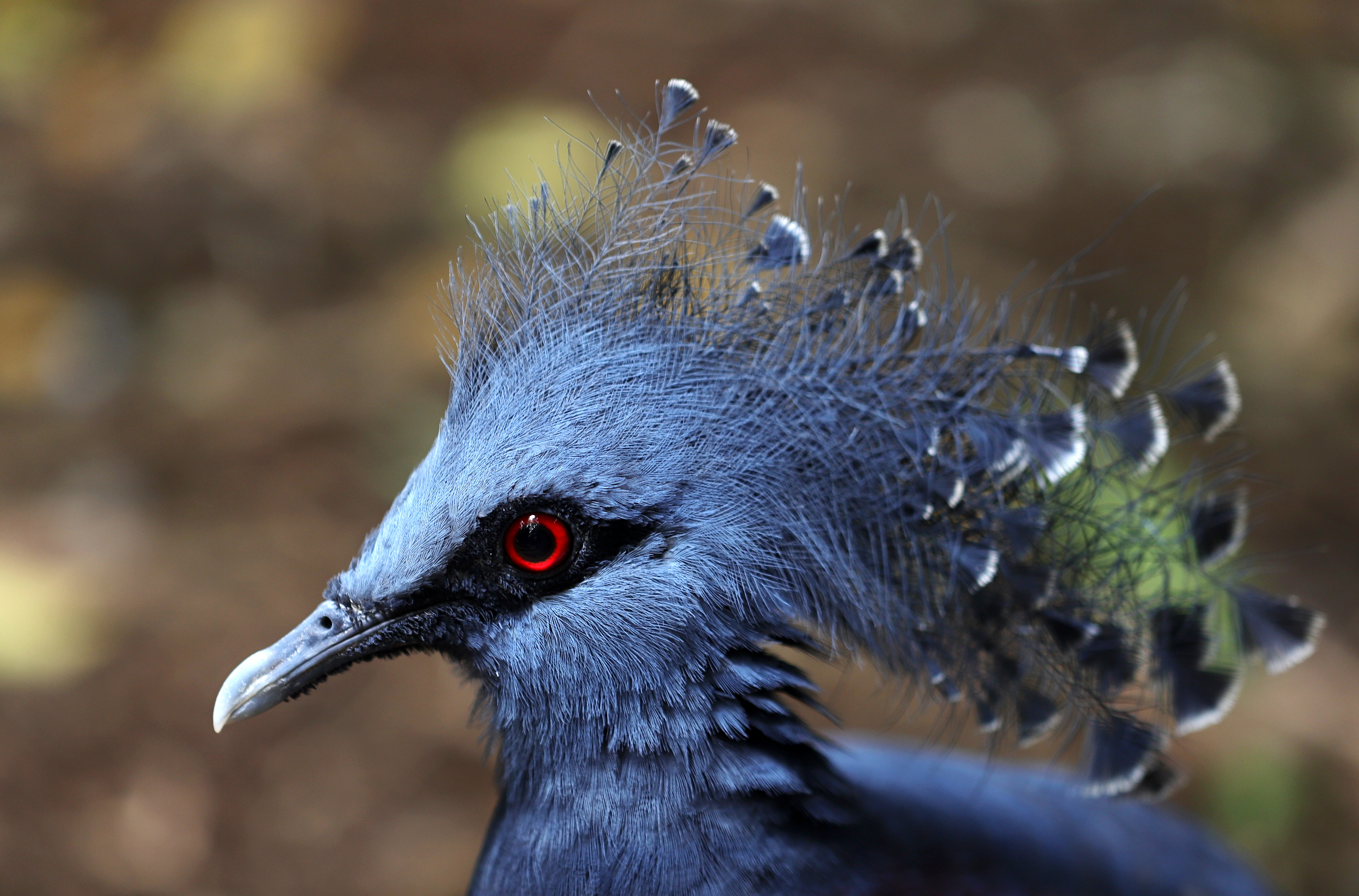
Victoria crowned pigeon

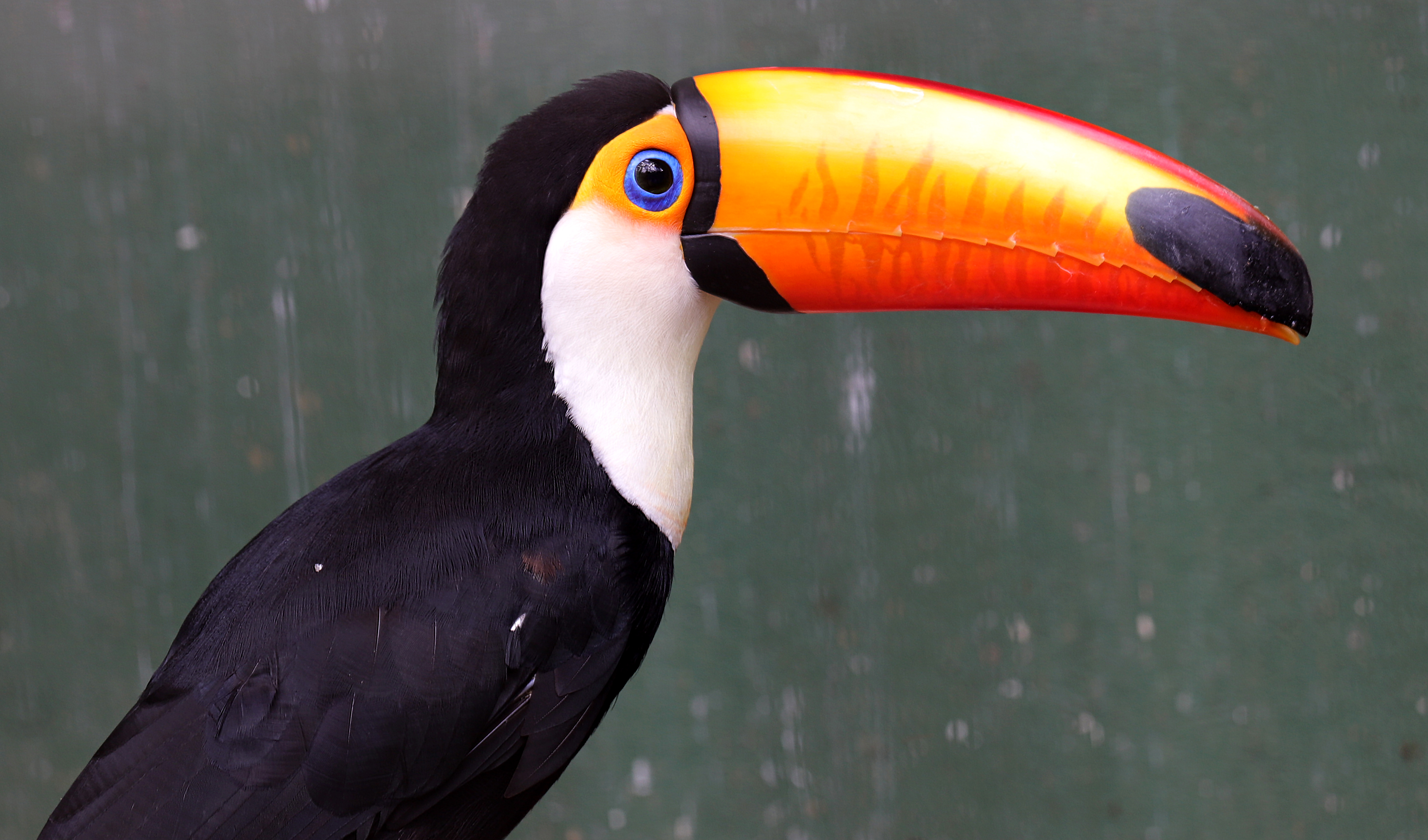
Toco toucan

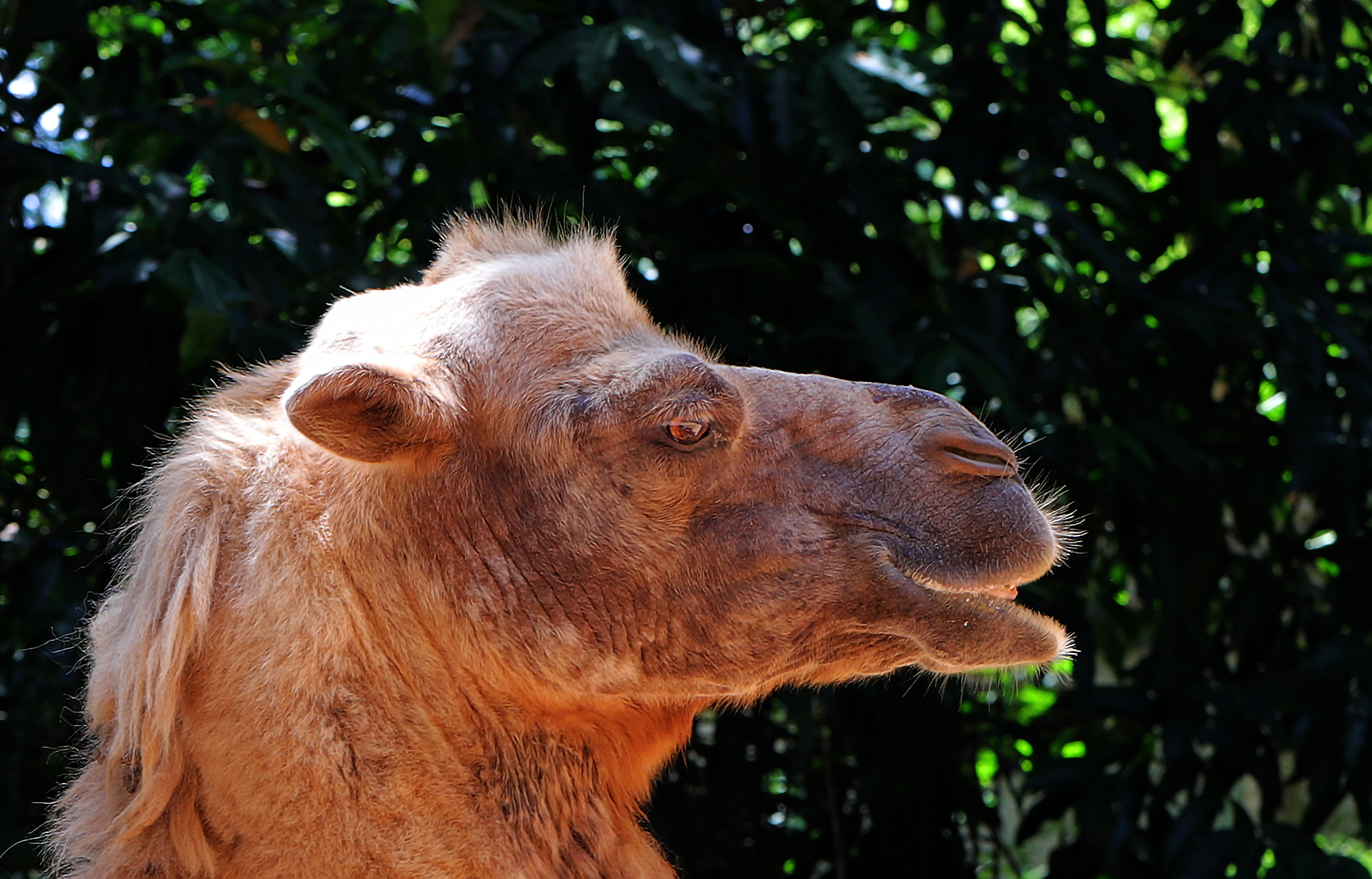
Bactrian camel

== See also ==
- Pinnawala Elephant Orphanage
- Pinnawala Open Zoo
- Ridiyagama Safari Park
