= Aubrey Weinman =

Ceylonese soldier, civil servant and naturalist

Aubrey Neil Weinman
- Born: 1897; Colombo, British Ceylon
- Died: 8 October 1967; Applecross, Western Australia
- Military career
- Allegiance: United Kingdom
- Branch: British Army
- Rank: Major
- Conflicts: World War I World War II

Major Aubrey Neil Weinman, OBE CMZS (1897–10 August 1967) was a Ceylonese soldier, civil servant and naturalist. He was the first Director of the Colombo Zoological Gardens (1947-1962).

== Early life ==
Weinman was born in Colombo, the son of William Algernon Weinman (1869-1922), a stationmaster, and Caroline Maud née Reimers (1872-1961). He attended school at the Royal College, Colombo, where he was a sergeant in the Cadet Corps. Following the outbreak of World War I, he traveled to England in April 1918 to join the British Army. In November he was commissioned as a 2nd Lieutenant in the Indian Army, of the 9th Bhopal Infantry. He saw action on the western front and was wounded in battle. After the war he remained in the reserves.

== Career ==
He joined the government service and was appointed the second Superintendent of the Colombo Zoological Gardens after it was established in 1939, following the liquidation of Zoological Garden Company in 1936. During his service, new programs included introducing more native and foreign species, education and conservation programs, and improving the facilities and infrastructure.

With the outbreak of World War II in the far east, Weinman was mobilised for service as a Major with the British Army under the Malaya Command. He became a POW after the fall of Singapore. He spent four years in a prisoner of war camp and was liberated at war's end.

On his return he became the inaugural Director of the Colombo Zoological Gardens and remained there until his retirement in 1962.

He was awarded an OBE as part of the 1954 New Year Honours.

== Personal life ==
After retirement, he moved to Australia with his wife Ena née van Cuylenberg and son David. He died in Perth in 1967.

== Bibliography ==
- Weinman, Aubrey Neil (1969). My Personal Ark. Colombo: Lake House Investments.
