= Pinnawala Open Zoo =

Sri Lankan zoo

Pinnawala Open Zoo of Sri Lanka පින්නවල සත්වෝද්‍යානය
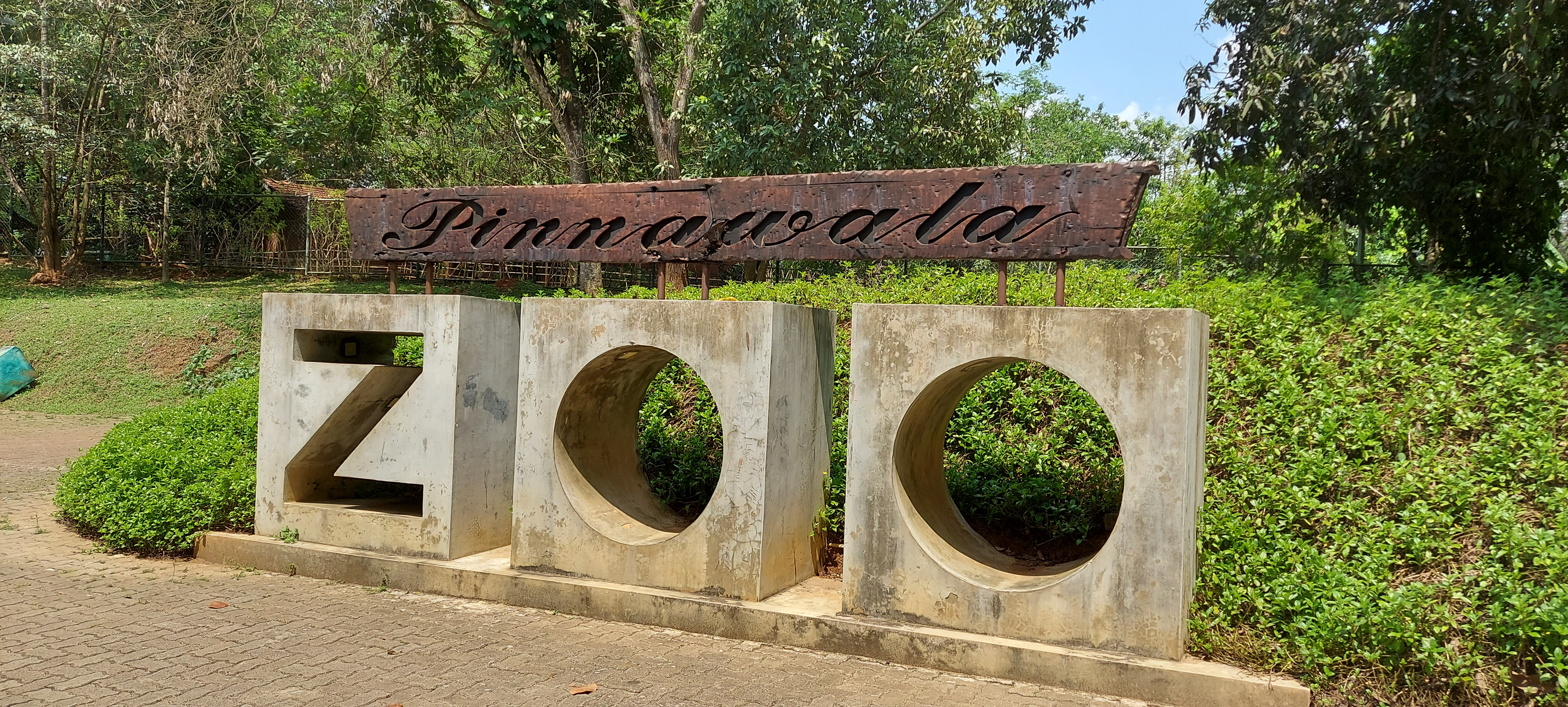
- Entrance
- Interactive map of Pinnawala Open Zoo of Sri Lanka පින්නවල සත්වෝද්‍යානය
- 7°18′2″N 80°23′18″E
- Date opened: 17 April 2015
- Location: Pinnawala, Rambukkana
- Land area: 44 acres
- No. of animals: 100+
- No. of species: 30+
- Major exhibits: Mammals, Birds, Reptiles

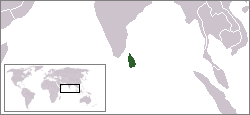
Location of Sri Lanka

Pinnawala Open Zoo (also called Pinnawala Zoo: Sinhala: පින්නවල සත්වෝද්‍යානය) is a zoological garden in Pinnawala, Sri Lanka, which is situated closer to the Pinnawala Elephant Orphanage. The zoo was opened for public on 17 April 2015. This is the first open-air zoo in Sri Lanka and second zoo in Sri Lanka after Dehiwala zoo. The zoo was opened for the visitors free of charge from 17 – 30 of April 2015.

== History ==
Sri Lanka has a rich diversity of animals across the country. Basically, the Dehiwala zoo provides all the facilities for many animals all over the world and due to high abundance of species, there was a difficulty of keeping endemic and native animals of Sri Lanka in those controlled condition. The commencement of Pinnawala Open Zoo first came through the period of former President Chandrika Kumaratunga in 2000. But the constructions were stopped in 2002 due to some disputes among the government, where the construction officially started in 2008 within former President Mahinda Rajapakse's period. The zoo was opened on 17 April 2015 by Tourism & Sports minister Mr. Navin Dissanayake and National Zoological Gardens Department Director General Anura de Silva. The expenditure for constructing the zoo is 862 million LKR.

== Zoo ==
The Pinnawala zoo is home for the many endemic animals in Sri Lanka. The zoo is divided into 7 enclosures, where the monkey island, Bird aviary, Amphibian area, and Pet area 2 are still in construction. There are internal road network throughout the zoo.

The 7 main enclosures are:

- Pet area
- Swan pond
- Deer enclosure
- Crocodile enclosure
- Leopard enclosure
- Bear enclosure
- Butterfly garden

== Animals ==
The zoo is divided into two sections: the Sri Lankan zone and the World zone. Currently, the zoo is home for many native animals such as chital, lion, Sri Lanka Leopard, Purple-faced leaf monkey, Wild boar, Sambar, Asian elephant, and different endemic bird species. The leopard watching area is the largest of them all.

== Gallery ==
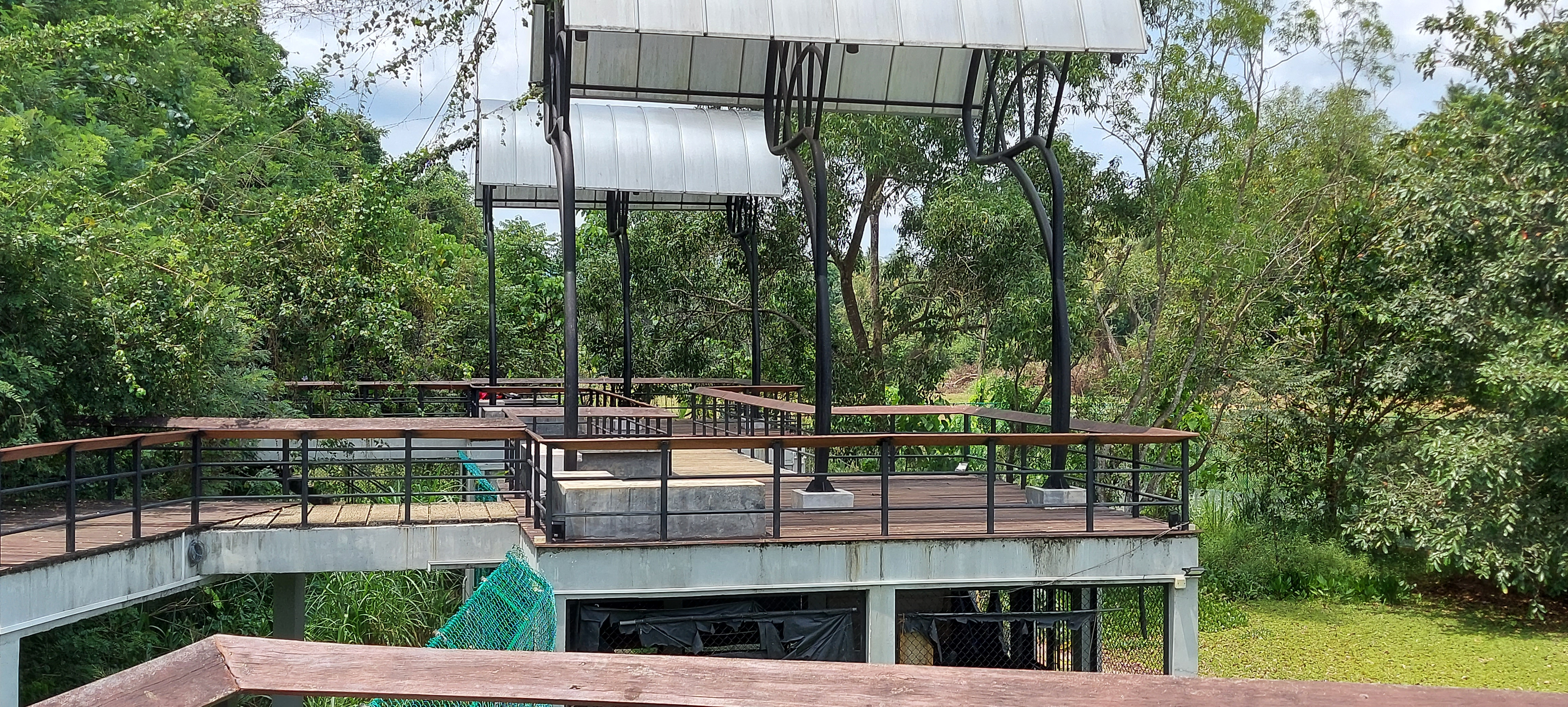
Flamingo section

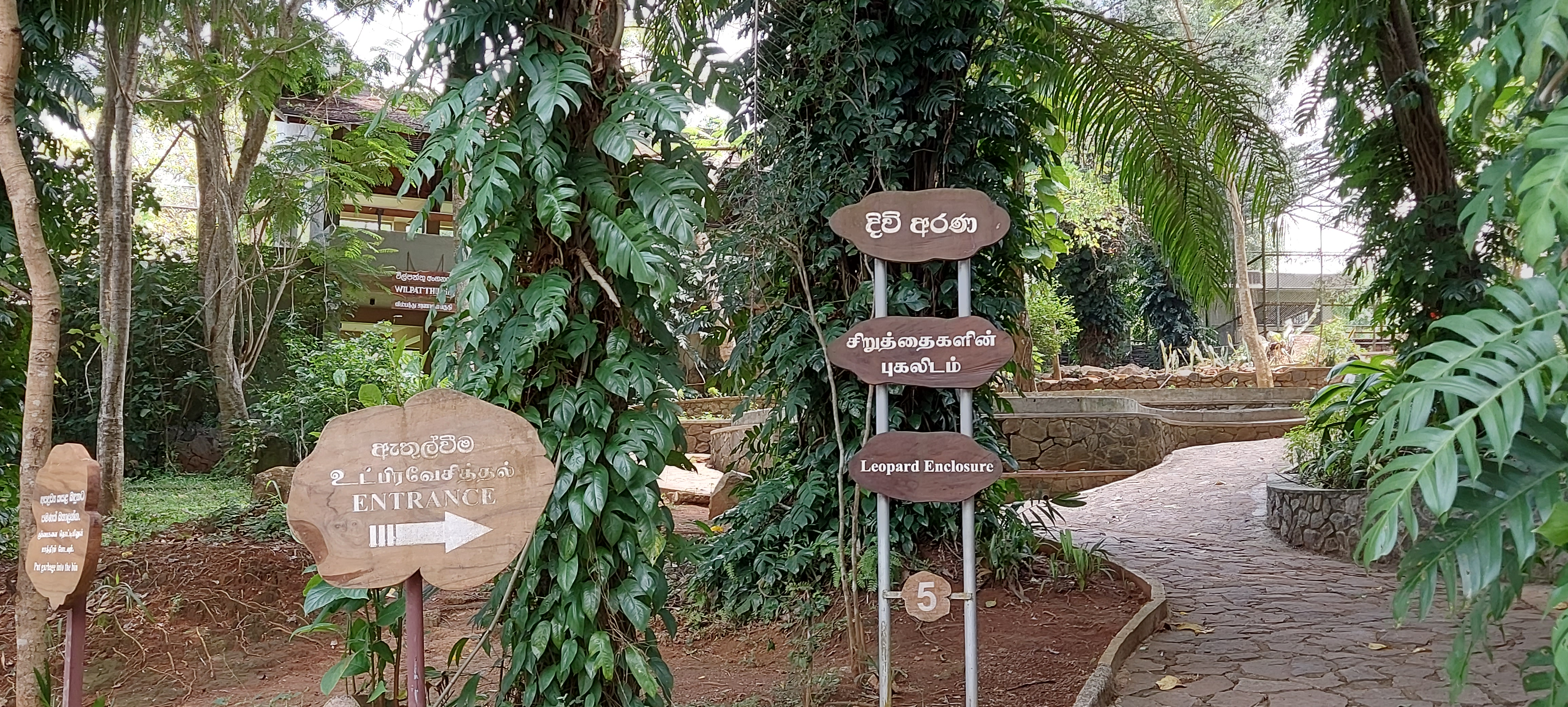
Leopard enclosure

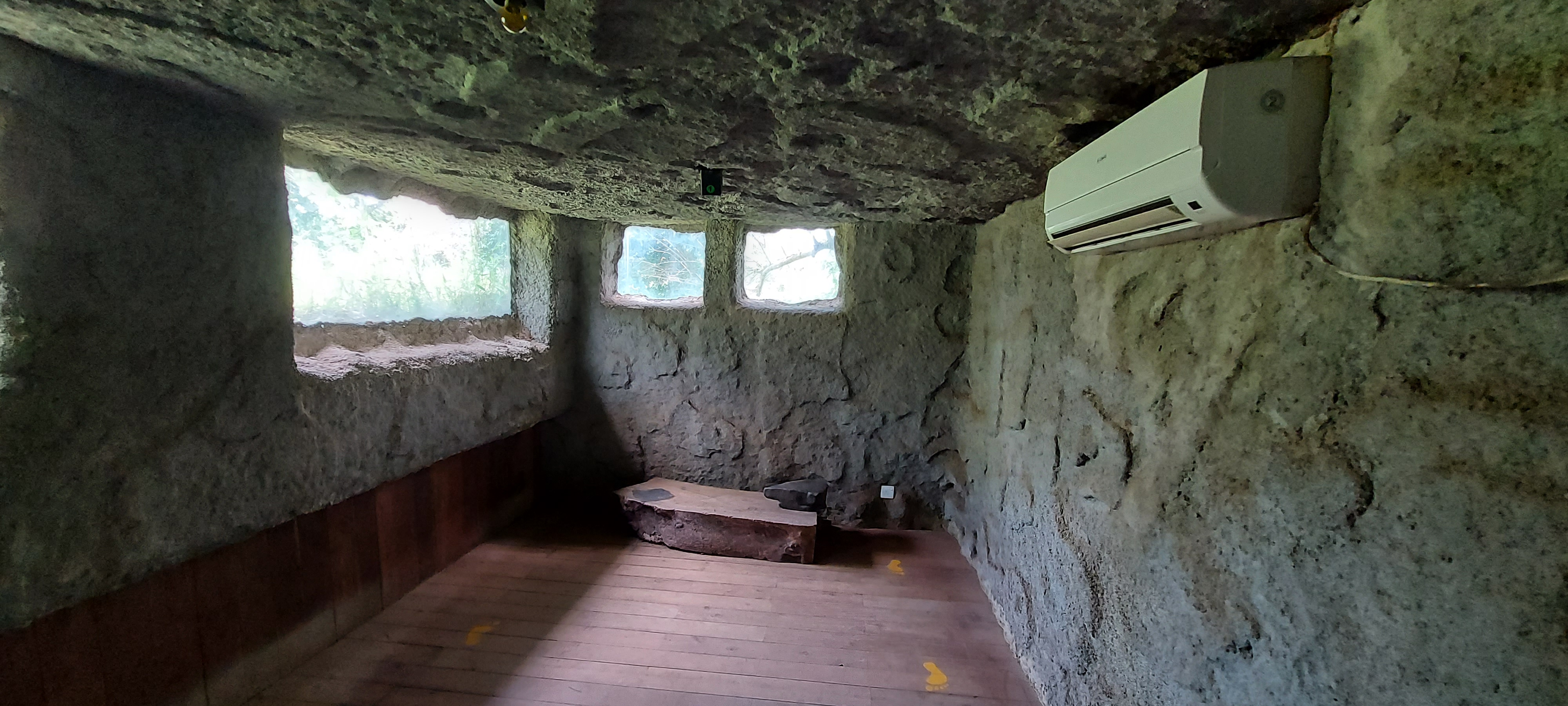
Leopard watching room

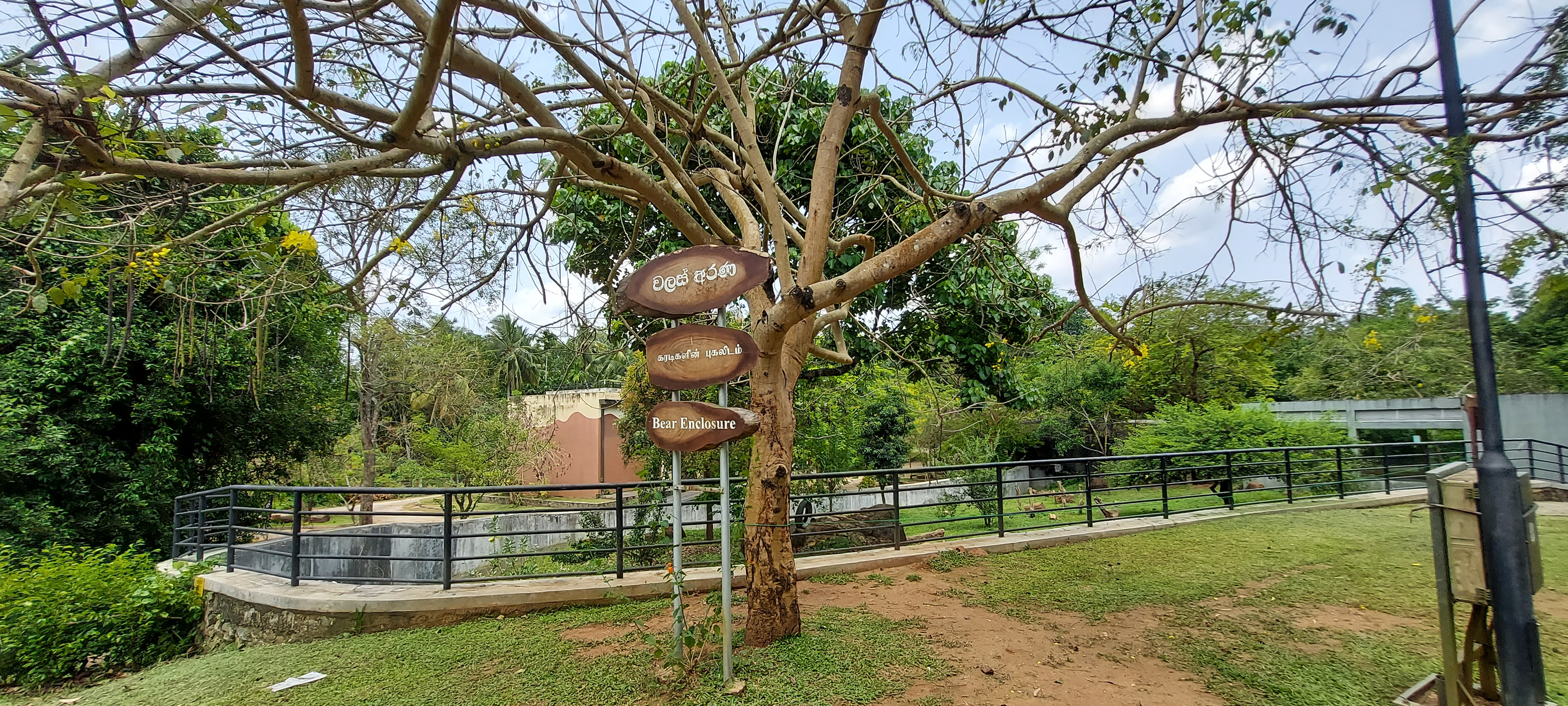
Sloth bear enclosure

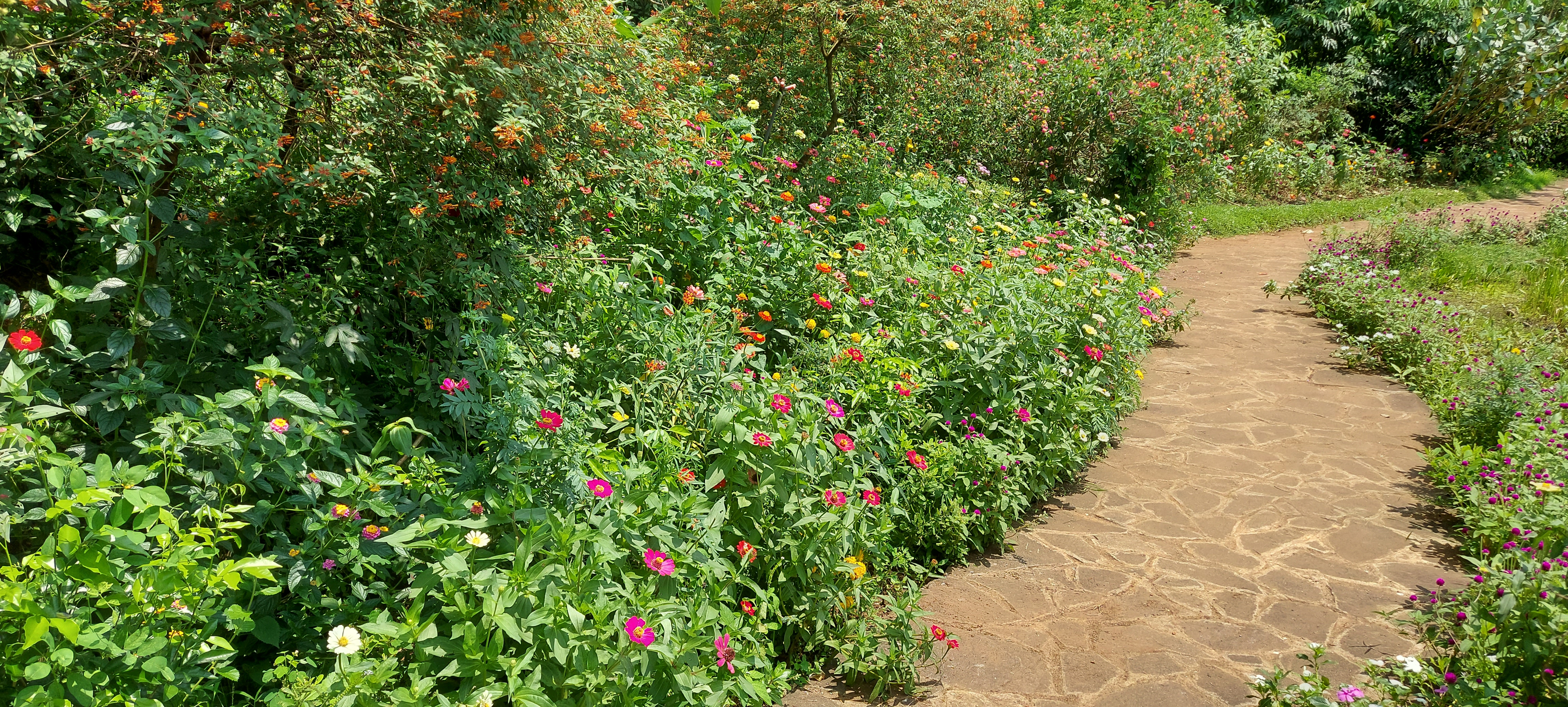
Butterfly garden

== See also ==
- Pinnawala Elephant Orphanage
- Dehiwala National Zoological Gardens
