= John Hagenbeck =

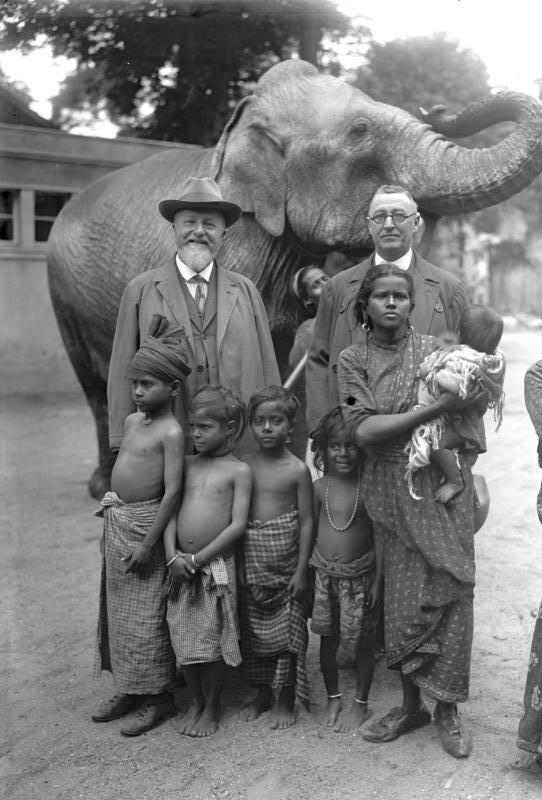
Ludwig Heck (back left) with John Hagenbeck (back right), a woman, children and an elephant. (c. 1931)

John Heinrich August Hagenbeck (15 October 1866, Hamburg —16 December 1940, Colombo) was a German animal dealer, a plantation owner in Ceylon and a writer of books. He was the originator of what is now Dehiwala Zoo in Colombo.

John was the eldest son from the second marriage of Carl Claes Gottfried Hagenbeck and thus a half-brother of Carl Hagenbeck, well known for his zoos. John worked for Carl Hagenbeck from 1881, transporting animals and travelling on his behalf. In 1886 he visited Ceylon and recruited people for Hagenbeck's Völkerschau or "human zoo". In 1891 he moved to Colombo and worked as a planter. He soon acquired rubber, cocoa and tea plantations. He also traded in animals. In 1914, at the start of the war, he moved to Indonesia to avoid internment and then fled to Germany. He started a film company in Berlin in 1918 which produced films on his travels. He also wrote several books.

The Hagenbecks had an animal catching station near Kilimanjaro and John accompanied Baron Axel Blixen for a hunt in the area. John was also a friend of Leonard Woolf who was briefly stationed in Hambantota.

In 1927 he returned to Colombo and started a zoo in Dehiwala in 1929. The zoo was sold to the British government in 1935 and all his properties were seized in 1939 by the British. He died in Colombo in 1940.
