= Rare Species Conservation Centre =

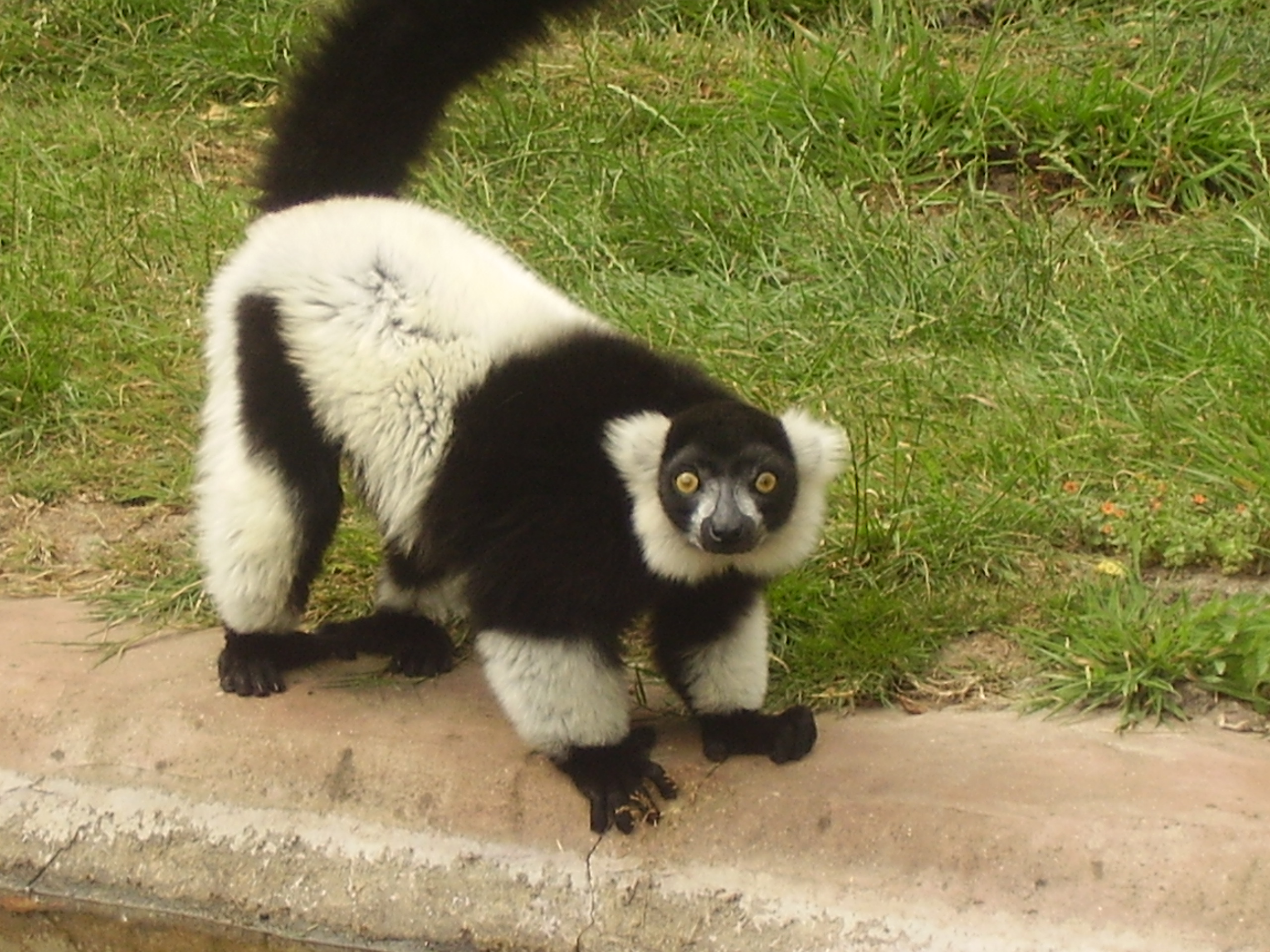
- Black-and-white ruffed lemur at the Monkey Rainforest, predecessor to the RSCC
- Interactive map of Rare Species Conservation Centre
- 51°15′40″N 1°19′37″E
- Date opened: 2006
- Date closed: 31 August 2015
- Location: Sandwich, Kent, England
- Land area: 1.5 acres (0.61 ha)

The Rare Species Conservation Centre (RSCC) was a conservation centre and zoological gardens situated just outside Sandwich in Kent, England, operated by The Rare Species Conservation Trust, a UK registered charity. Its purpose was to educate visitors and create awareness of the plight of some of the world's lesser-known rare and endangered species of animal. It was home to rare and unusual animals. It closed due to lack of funds on 31 August 2015.

== History ==
The RSCC was created in 2006, having formerly been a small children's zoo called The Monkey Rainforest which was home to species of lemurs, cats, birds, reptiles, and other creatures. By 2010, the park struggled to keep itself open year-round, and announced it would no longer support daily admission. It would re-open in July 2011, only to close once again in Summer of 2011. In 2014 however, the site re-opened once again, now with new species on display, such as tarsiers and cuscus. However, in 2015, it could no longer financially sustain itself, and by September 2015, the site had closed once again, this time for good.

In 2017, Wingham Wildlife Park acquired the site, forming the Sandwich Wildlife Park. This location was not one of daily admission, but rather was funded by 'animal experiences', with the part open to those unbooked being a coffee shop. Some of the animals from the former RSCC stayed at Sandwich, including the maned wolves and clouded leopards. However, in January 2021, the park announced closure due to the COVID-19 Pandemic, with the park's animals being relocated, making it the third zoo to close on the site. The future of the site remains uncertain.

== Exhibits ==
The 1.5-acre (0.61 ha) zoo consisted of two major areas, an indoor covered rainforest and outdoor geographic areas, each divided into areas corresponding to the geographical groupings of the animals.

The indoor rainforest housed the collection of Australasian animals and those from South and Central America. It had a large stream running in a circular path throughout the exhibit, with two waterfalls and two large ponds.

The exterior had two main areas, one devoted to the fauna of Madagascar, and the other to animals from South-East Asia.

== Animals ==
The RSCC housed species of birds, reptiles, mammals and amphibians from Africa, South America, Australasia and Asia including: Bali starling, Victoria crowned pigeon, american flamingo, Madagascar teal, binturong, clouded leopard, cotton-top tamarin, emperor tamarin, crowned lemur, fat-tailed dwarf lemur, fossa, Goeldi's monkey, jaguarundi, Owston's civet, potto, pygmy slow loris, red ruffed lemur, slow loris, spectral tarsier, western lesser bamboo lemur, rhinoceros hornbill, smooth-coated otter, sun bear, radiated tortoise, Malayan tiger, fishing cat and snow leopard.

== Plans ==
The site occupied 1.5 acres (0.61 ha). The charitable trust that operated the centre hoped to expand into 5 acres (2.0 ha) adjacent to the current property.
